

52001–52100 

|-bgcolor=#d6d6d6
| 52001 ||  || — || October 16, 2001 || Socorro || LINEAR || — || align=right | 6.7 km || 
|-id=002 bgcolor=#d6d6d6
| 52002 ||  || — || October 16, 2001 || Socorro || LINEAR || EOS || align=right | 6.7 km || 
|-id=003 bgcolor=#d6d6d6
| 52003 ||  || — || November 8, 2001 || Palomar || NEAT || — || align=right | 16 km || 
|-id=004 bgcolor=#d6d6d6
| 52004 ||  || — || December 18, 2001 || Kingsnake || J. V. McClusky || TEL || align=right | 5.0 km || 
|-id=005 bgcolor=#fefefe
| 52005 Maik ||  ||  || February 8, 2002 || Fountain Hills || C. W. Juels, P. R. Holvorcem || — || align=right | 4.5 km || 
|-id=006 bgcolor=#E9E9E9
| 52006 ||  || — || March 10, 2002 || Socorro || LINEAR || — || align=right | 4.8 km || 
|-id=007 bgcolor=#d6d6d6
| 52007 ||  || — || March 12, 2002 || Palomar || NEAT || Tj (2.92) || align=right | 12 km || 
|-id=008 bgcolor=#d6d6d6
| 52008 Johnnaka ||  ||  || March 9, 2002 || Catalina || CSS || — || align=right | 8.2 km || 
|-id=009 bgcolor=#d6d6d6
| 52009 ||  || — || March 14, 2002 || Anderson Mesa || LONEOS || KAR || align=right | 2.5 km || 
|-id=010 bgcolor=#E9E9E9
| 52010 ||  || — || May 9, 2002 || Socorro || LINEAR || — || align=right | 4.6 km || 
|-id=011 bgcolor=#fefefe
| 52011 ||  || — || June 6, 2002 || Socorro || LINEAR || slow? || align=right | 3.5 km || 
|-id=012 bgcolor=#d6d6d6
| 52012 ||  || — || June 15, 2002 || Socorro || LINEAR || ALA || align=right | 8.9 km || 
|-id=013 bgcolor=#E9E9E9
| 52013 ||  || — || June 12, 2002 || Anderson Mesa || LONEOS || — || align=right | 3.6 km || 
|-id=014 bgcolor=#fefefe
| 52014 ||  || — || July 4, 2002 || Palomar || NEAT || NYS || align=right | 1.9 km || 
|-id=015 bgcolor=#fefefe
| 52015 ||  || — || July 13, 2002 || Socorro || LINEAR || PHO || align=right | 3.5 km || 
|-id=016 bgcolor=#d6d6d6
| 52016 ||  || — || July 9, 2002 || Socorro || LINEAR || 3:2 || align=right | 14 km || 
|-id=017 bgcolor=#fefefe
| 52017 ||  || — || July 9, 2002 || Socorro || LINEAR || NYS || align=right | 1.4 km || 
|-id=018 bgcolor=#d6d6d6
| 52018 ||  || — || July 9, 2002 || Socorro || LINEAR || — || align=right | 6.8 km || 
|-id=019 bgcolor=#E9E9E9
| 52019 ||  || — || July 13, 2002 || Socorro || LINEAR || — || align=right | 5.0 km || 
|-id=020 bgcolor=#E9E9E9
| 52020 ||  || — || July 14, 2002 || Socorro || LINEAR || — || align=right | 3.4 km || 
|-id=021 bgcolor=#E9E9E9
| 52021 ||  || — || July 13, 2002 || Socorro || LINEAR || — || align=right | 2.5 km || 
|-id=022 bgcolor=#fefefe
| 52022 ||  || — || July 14, 2002 || Palomar || NEAT || NYS || align=right | 1.2 km || 
|-id=023 bgcolor=#d6d6d6
| 52023 ||  || — || July 17, 2002 || Socorro || LINEAR || EOS || align=right | 6.3 km || 
|-id=024 bgcolor=#d6d6d6
| 52024 ||  || — || July 17, 2002 || Socorro || LINEAR || EOS || align=right | 6.6 km || 
|-id=025 bgcolor=#d6d6d6
| 52025 ||  || — || July 18, 2002 || Socorro || LINEAR || EOS || align=right | 5.5 km || 
|-id=026 bgcolor=#E9E9E9
| 52026 ||  || — || July 28, 2002 || Haleakala || NEAT || — || align=right | 9.1 km || 
|-id=027 bgcolor=#d6d6d6
| 52027 ||  || — || July 28, 2002 || Haleakala || NEAT || — || align=right | 11 km || 
|-id=028 bgcolor=#E9E9E9
| 52028 ||  || — || August 6, 2002 || Palomar || NEAT || — || align=right | 2.5 km || 
|-id=029 bgcolor=#fefefe
| 52029 ||  || — || August 6, 2002 || Palomar || NEAT || V || align=right | 1.8 km || 
|-id=030 bgcolor=#fefefe
| 52030 Maxvasile ||  ||  || August 6, 2002 || Campo Imperatore || CINEOS || — || align=right | 2.0 km || 
|-id=031 bgcolor=#d6d6d6
| 52031 ||  || — || August 6, 2002 || Palomar || NEAT || — || align=right | 3.2 km || 
|-id=032 bgcolor=#E9E9E9
| 52032 ||  || — || August 5, 2002 || Socorro || LINEAR || — || align=right | 3.3 km || 
|-id=033 bgcolor=#fefefe
| 52033 ||  || — || August 5, 2002 || Socorro || LINEAR || MAS || align=right | 1.6 km || 
|-id=034 bgcolor=#E9E9E9
| 52034 ||  || — || August 9, 2002 || Ametlla de Mar || J. Nomen || — || align=right | 3.7 km || 
|-id=035 bgcolor=#E9E9E9
| 52035 ||  || — || August 4, 2002 || Socorro || LINEAR || — || align=right | 5.8 km || 
|-id=036 bgcolor=#fefefe
| 52036 ||  || — || August 9, 2002 || Socorro || LINEAR || — || align=right | 1.8 km || 
|-id=037 bgcolor=#d6d6d6
| 52037 ||  || — || August 10, 2002 || Socorro || LINEAR || — || align=right | 8.4 km || 
|-id=038 bgcolor=#E9E9E9
| 52038 ||  || — || August 10, 2002 || Socorro || LINEAR || — || align=right | 4.2 km || 
|-id=039 bgcolor=#E9E9E9
| 52039 ||  || — || August 10, 2002 || Socorro || LINEAR || — || align=right | 3.5 km || 
|-id=040 bgcolor=#E9E9E9
| 52040 ||  || — || August 11, 2002 || Socorro || LINEAR || — || align=right | 2.0 km || 
|-id=041 bgcolor=#fefefe
| 52041 ||  || — || August 11, 2002 || Socorro || LINEAR || — || align=right | 2.6 km || 
|-id=042 bgcolor=#E9E9E9
| 52042 ||  || — || August 8, 2002 || Palomar || NEAT || — || align=right | 4.0 km || 
|-id=043 bgcolor=#E9E9E9
| 52043 ||  || — || August 12, 2002 || Socorro || LINEAR || — || align=right | 2.0 km || 
|-id=044 bgcolor=#fefefe
| 52044 ||  || — || August 12, 2002 || Socorro || LINEAR || ERI || align=right | 3.3 km || 
|-id=045 bgcolor=#E9E9E9
| 52045 ||  || — || August 4, 2002 || Palomar || NEAT || MAR || align=right | 2.8 km || 
|-id=046 bgcolor=#fefefe
| 52046 ||  || — || August 10, 2002 || Socorro || LINEAR || — || align=right | 1.5 km || 
|-id=047 bgcolor=#d6d6d6
| 52047 ||  || — || August 10, 2002 || Socorro || LINEAR || THM || align=right | 7.3 km || 
|-id=048 bgcolor=#d6d6d6
| 52048 ||  || — || August 14, 2002 || Socorro || LINEAR || — || align=right | 4.7 km || 
|-id=049 bgcolor=#fefefe
| 52049 ||  || — || August 14, 2002 || Socorro || LINEAR || NYS || align=right | 1.5 km || 
|-id=050 bgcolor=#E9E9E9
| 52050 ||  || — || August 14, 2002 || Socorro || LINEAR || — || align=right | 2.2 km || 
|-id=051 bgcolor=#fefefe
| 52051 ||  || — || August 14, 2002 || Socorro || LINEAR || — || align=right | 2.5 km || 
|-id=052 bgcolor=#E9E9E9
| 52052 ||  || — || August 12, 2002 || Socorro || LINEAR || — || align=right | 6.8 km || 
|-id=053 bgcolor=#E9E9E9
| 52053 ||  || — || August 13, 2002 || Anderson Mesa || LONEOS || — || align=right | 5.4 km || 
|-id=054 bgcolor=#E9E9E9
| 52054 ||  || — || August 13, 2002 || Anderson Mesa || LONEOS || — || align=right | 3.9 km || 
|-id=055 bgcolor=#fefefe
| 52055 ||  || — || August 14, 2002 || Socorro || LINEAR || — || align=right | 1.4 km || 
|-id=056 bgcolor=#fefefe
| 52056 ||  || — || August 14, 2002 || Socorro || LINEAR || — || align=right | 1.7 km || 
|-id=057 bgcolor=#E9E9E9
| 52057 Clarkhowell ||  ||  || August 15, 2002 || Tenagra || M. Schwartz, P. R. Holvorcem || — || align=right | 4.5 km || 
|-id=058 bgcolor=#fefefe
| 52058 ||  || — || August 14, 2002 || Socorro || LINEAR || MAS || align=right | 1.8 km || 
|-id=059 bgcolor=#fefefe
| 52059 ||  || — || August 14, 2002 || Socorro || LINEAR || NYS || align=right | 1.9 km || 
|-id=060 bgcolor=#fefefe
| 52060 ||  || — || August 16, 2002 || Palomar || NEAT || — || align=right | 5.1 km || 
|-id=061 bgcolor=#d6d6d6
| 52061 ||  || — || August 20, 2002 || Palomar || NEAT || — || align=right | 5.7 km || 
|-id=062 bgcolor=#d6d6d6
| 52062 ||  || — || August 26, 2002 || Palomar || NEAT || — || align=right | 5.8 km || 
|-id=063 bgcolor=#fefefe
| 52063 ||  || — || August 26, 2002 || Palomar || NEAT || — || align=right | 2.7 km || 
|-id=064 bgcolor=#d6d6d6
| 52064 ||  || — || August 28, 2002 || Palomar || NEAT || EOS || align=right | 5.2 km || 
|-id=065 bgcolor=#fefefe
| 52065 ||  || — || August 27, 2002 || Palomar || NEAT || — || align=right | 1.8 km || 
|-id=066 bgcolor=#fefefe
| 52066 ||  || — || August 28, 2002 || Palomar || NEAT || NYS || align=right | 1.2 km || 
|-id=067 bgcolor=#d6d6d6
| 52067 ||  || — || August 29, 2002 || Ametlla de Mar || Ametlla de Mar Obs. || — || align=right | 8.4 km || 
|-id=068 bgcolor=#d6d6d6
| 52068 ||  || — || August 29, 2002 || Palomar || NEAT || 3:2 || align=right | 16 km || 
|-id=069 bgcolor=#fefefe
| 52069 ||  || — || August 29, 2002 || Palomar || NEAT || — || align=right | 1.7 km || 
|-id=070 bgcolor=#d6d6d6
| 52070 ||  || — || August 29, 2002 || Palomar || NEAT || — || align=right | 6.9 km || 
|-id=071 bgcolor=#d6d6d6
| 52071 ||  || — || August 29, 2002 || Palomar || NEAT || THM || align=right | 6.9 km || 
|-id=072 bgcolor=#E9E9E9
| 52072 ||  || — || August 29, 2002 || Kitt Peak || Spacewatch || HEN || align=right | 2.9 km || 
|-id=073 bgcolor=#E9E9E9
| 52073 ||  || — || August 29, 2002 || Kitt Peak || Spacewatch || — || align=right | 2.7 km || 
|-id=074 bgcolor=#fefefe
| 52074 ||  || — || September 4, 2002 || Anderson Mesa || LONEOS || — || align=right | 1.5 km || 
|-id=075 bgcolor=#E9E9E9
| 52075 ||  || — || September 3, 2002 || Palomar || NEAT || — || align=right | 4.1 km || 
|-id=076 bgcolor=#E9E9E9
| 52076 ||  || — || September 3, 2002 || El Centro || W. K. Y. Yeung || — || align=right | 8.7 km || 
|-id=077 bgcolor=#E9E9E9
| 52077 ||  || — || September 4, 2002 || Anderson Mesa || LONEOS || — || align=right | 5.5 km || 
|-id=078 bgcolor=#E9E9E9
| 52078 ||  || — || September 4, 2002 || Anderson Mesa || LONEOS || — || align=right | 2.8 km || 
|-id=079 bgcolor=#d6d6d6
| 52079 ||  || — || September 5, 2002 || Socorro || LINEAR || 3:2 || align=right | 10 km || 
|-id=080 bgcolor=#fefefe
| 52080 ||  || — || September 5, 2002 || Socorro || LINEAR || — || align=right | 2.4 km || 
|-id=081 bgcolor=#fefefe
| 52081 ||  || — || September 5, 2002 || Anderson Mesa || LONEOS || V || align=right | 1.4 km || 
|-id=082 bgcolor=#fefefe
| 52082 ||  || — || September 5, 2002 || Socorro || LINEAR || NYS || align=right | 1.5 km || 
|-id=083 bgcolor=#E9E9E9
| 52083 ||  || — || September 5, 2002 || Socorro || LINEAR || — || align=right | 1.4 km || 
|-id=084 bgcolor=#d6d6d6
| 52084 ||  || — || September 5, 2002 || Anderson Mesa || LONEOS || — || align=right | 10 km || 
|-id=085 bgcolor=#E9E9E9
| 52085 ||  || — || September 5, 2002 || Socorro || LINEAR || — || align=right | 2.5 km || 
|-id=086 bgcolor=#E9E9E9
| 52086 ||  || — || September 5, 2002 || Haleakala || NEAT || — || align=right | 3.9 km || 
|-id=087 bgcolor=#E9E9E9
| 52087 ||  || — || September 6, 2002 || Socorro || LINEAR || EUN || align=right | 4.7 km || 
|-id=088 bgcolor=#fefefe
| 52088 || 2014 P-L || — || September 24, 1960 || Palomar || PLS || — || align=right | 2.9 km || 
|-id=089 bgcolor=#fefefe
| 52089 || 2027 P-L || — || September 24, 1960 || Palomar || PLS || NYS || align=right | 1.7 km || 
|-id=090 bgcolor=#E9E9E9
| 52090 || 2046 P-L || — || September 24, 1960 || Palomar || PLS || — || align=right | 2.8 km || 
|-id=091 bgcolor=#E9E9E9
| 52091 || 2075 P-L || — || September 24, 1960 || Palomar || PLS || — || align=right | 4.1 km || 
|-id=092 bgcolor=#E9E9E9
| 52092 || 2083 P-L || — || September 24, 1960 || Palomar || PLS || — || align=right | 2.4 km || 
|-id=093 bgcolor=#E9E9E9
| 52093 || 2088 P-L || — || September 24, 1960 || Palomar || PLS || HOF || align=right | 5.0 km || 
|-id=094 bgcolor=#d6d6d6
| 52094 || 2177 P-L || — || September 24, 1960 || Palomar || PLS || — || align=right | 4.4 km || 
|-id=095 bgcolor=#d6d6d6
| 52095 || 2191 P-L || — || September 24, 1960 || Palomar || PLS || — || align=right | 4.0 km || 
|-id=096 bgcolor=#fefefe
| 52096 || 2221 P-L || — || September 24, 1960 || Palomar || PLS || — || align=right | 1.2 km || 
|-id=097 bgcolor=#fefefe
| 52097 || 2565 P-L || — || September 24, 1960 || Palomar || PLS || — || align=right | 2.9 km || 
|-id=098 bgcolor=#E9E9E9
| 52098 || 2568 P-L || — || September 24, 1960 || Palomar || PLS || AGN || align=right | 3.9 km || 
|-id=099 bgcolor=#E9E9E9
| 52099 || 2589 P-L || — || September 24, 1960 || Palomar || PLS || — || align=right | 4.6 km || 
|-id=100 bgcolor=#E9E9E9
| 52100 || 2591 P-L || — || September 24, 1960 || Palomar || PLS || — || align=right | 6.4 km || 
|}

52101–52200 

|-bgcolor=#E9E9E9
| 52101 || 2598 P-L || — || September 24, 1960 || Palomar || PLS || HOF || align=right | 7.5 km || 
|-id=102 bgcolor=#fefefe
| 52102 || 2616 P-L || — || September 24, 1960 || Palomar || PLS || — || align=right | 2.0 km || 
|-id=103 bgcolor=#fefefe
| 52103 || 2658 P-L || — || September 24, 1960 || Palomar || PLS || V || align=right | 1.9 km || 
|-id=104 bgcolor=#d6d6d6
| 52104 || 2660 P-L || — || September 24, 1960 || Palomar || PLS || — || align=right | 6.1 km || 
|-id=105 bgcolor=#fefefe
| 52105 || 2669 P-L || — || September 24, 1960 || Palomar || PLS || FLO || align=right | 1.3 km || 
|-id=106 bgcolor=#E9E9E9
| 52106 || 2673 P-L || — || September 24, 1960 || Palomar || PLS || AST || align=right | 4.4 km || 
|-id=107 bgcolor=#fefefe
| 52107 || 2703 P-L || — || September 24, 1960 || Palomar || PLS || — || align=right | 1.9 km || 
|-id=108 bgcolor=#d6d6d6
| 52108 || 2830 P-L || — || September 24, 1960 || Palomar || PLS || — || align=right | 5.2 km || 
|-id=109 bgcolor=#E9E9E9
| 52109 || 2863 P-L || — || September 24, 1960 || Palomar || PLS || — || align=right | 5.3 km || 
|-id=110 bgcolor=#E9E9E9
| 52110 || 3007 P-L || — || September 24, 1960 || Palomar || PLS || — || align=right | 2.6 km || 
|-id=111 bgcolor=#d6d6d6
| 52111 || 3020 P-L || — || September 24, 1960 || Palomar || PLS || EOS || align=right | 6.5 km || 
|-id=112 bgcolor=#fefefe
| 52112 || 3064 P-L || — || September 25, 1960 || Palomar || PLS || V || align=right | 1.8 km || 
|-id=113 bgcolor=#d6d6d6
| 52113 || 3100 P-L || — || September 24, 1960 || Palomar || PLS || EOS || align=right | 7.5 km || 
|-id=114 bgcolor=#fefefe
| 52114 || 3118 P-L || — || September 24, 1960 || Palomar || PLS || — || align=right | 2.7 km || 
|-id=115 bgcolor=#d6d6d6
| 52115 || 3512 P-L || — || October 17, 1960 || Palomar || PLS || — || align=right | 6.7 km || 
|-id=116 bgcolor=#fefefe
| 52116 || 4032 P-L || — || September 24, 1960 || Palomar || PLS || FLO || align=right | 2.9 km || 
|-id=117 bgcolor=#E9E9E9
| 52117 || 4059 P-L || — || September 24, 1960 || Palomar || PLS || — || align=right | 1.9 km || 
|-id=118 bgcolor=#fefefe
| 52118 || 4103 P-L || — || September 24, 1960 || Palomar || PLS || NYS || align=right | 1.5 km || 
|-id=119 bgcolor=#E9E9E9
| 52119 || 4105 P-L || — || September 24, 1960 || Palomar || PLS || — || align=right | 3.3 km || 
|-id=120 bgcolor=#d6d6d6
| 52120 || 4106 P-L || — || September 24, 1960 || Palomar || PLS || — || align=right | 6.0 km || 
|-id=121 bgcolor=#E9E9E9
| 52121 || 4117 P-L || — || September 24, 1960 || Palomar || PLS || AGN || align=right | 3.2 km || 
|-id=122 bgcolor=#d6d6d6
| 52122 || 4128 P-L || — || September 24, 1960 || Palomar || PLS || EOS || align=right | 5.8 km || 
|-id=123 bgcolor=#E9E9E9
| 52123 || 4217 P-L || — || September 24, 1960 || Palomar || PLS || — || align=right | 2.7 km || 
|-id=124 bgcolor=#E9E9E9
| 52124 || 4272 P-L || — || September 24, 1960 || Palomar || PLS || — || align=right | 2.2 km || 
|-id=125 bgcolor=#fefefe
| 52125 || 4274 P-L || — || September 24, 1960 || Palomar || PLS || — || align=right | 3.6 km || 
|-id=126 bgcolor=#fefefe
| 52126 || 4284 P-L || — || September 24, 1960 || Palomar || PLS || V || align=right | 1.4 km || 
|-id=127 bgcolor=#d6d6d6
| 52127 || 4681 P-L || — || September 24, 1960 || Palomar || PLS || EOS || align=right | 4.2 km || 
|-id=128 bgcolor=#fefefe
| 52128 || 4693 P-L || — || September 24, 1960 || Palomar || PLS || NYS || align=right | 1.8 km || 
|-id=129 bgcolor=#fefefe
| 52129 || 4796 P-L || — || September 24, 1960 || Palomar || PLS || NYS || align=right | 1.1 km || 
|-id=130 bgcolor=#E9E9E9
| 52130 || 4882 P-L || — || September 26, 1960 || Palomar || PLS || — || align=right | 3.5 km || 
|-id=131 bgcolor=#d6d6d6
| 52131 || 4892 P-L || — || September 24, 1960 || Palomar || PLS || — || align=right | 5.9 km || 
|-id=132 bgcolor=#E9E9E9
| 52132 || 5034 P-L || — || October 17, 1960 || Palomar || PLS || — || align=right | 2.4 km || 
|-id=133 bgcolor=#E9E9E9
| 52133 || 6007 P-L || — || September 24, 1960 || Palomar || PLS || — || align=right | 4.7 km || 
|-id=134 bgcolor=#E9E9E9
| 52134 || 6059 P-L || — || September 24, 1960 || Palomar || PLS || HOF || align=right | 9.7 km || 
|-id=135 bgcolor=#E9E9E9
| 52135 || 6070 P-L || — || September 24, 1960 || Palomar || PLS || — || align=right | 7.5 km || 
|-id=136 bgcolor=#E9E9E9
| 52136 || 6076 P-L || — || September 24, 1960 || Palomar || PLS || — || align=right | 2.7 km || 
|-id=137 bgcolor=#fefefe
| 52137 || 6080 P-L || — || September 24, 1960 || Palomar || PLS || NYS || align=right | 1.5 km || 
|-id=138 bgcolor=#E9E9E9
| 52138 || 6131 P-L || — || September 24, 1960 || Palomar || PLS || — || align=right | 3.1 km || 
|-id=139 bgcolor=#d6d6d6
| 52139 || 6192 P-L || — || September 24, 1960 || Palomar || PLS || — || align=right | 5.2 km || 
|-id=140 bgcolor=#E9E9E9
| 52140 || 6603 P-L || — || September 24, 1960 || Palomar || PLS || — || align=right | 3.9 km || 
|-id=141 bgcolor=#E9E9E9
| 52141 || 6605 P-L || — || September 24, 1960 || Palomar || PLS || — || align=right | 3.6 km || 
|-id=142 bgcolor=#d6d6d6
| 52142 || 6610 P-L || — || September 24, 1960 || Palomar || PLS || — || align=right | 5.1 km || 
|-id=143 bgcolor=#fefefe
| 52143 || 6635 P-L || — || September 24, 1960 || Palomar || PLS || NYS || align=right | 1.7 km || 
|-id=144 bgcolor=#fefefe
| 52144 || 6759 P-L || — || September 24, 1960 || Palomar || PLS || — || align=right | 2.2 km || 
|-id=145 bgcolor=#fefefe
| 52145 || 6832 P-L || — || September 24, 1960 || Palomar || PLS || MAS || align=right | 2.4 km || 
|-id=146 bgcolor=#fefefe
| 52146 || 7061 P-L || — || October 17, 1960 || Palomar || PLS || V || align=right | 1.9 km || 
|-id=147 bgcolor=#E9E9E9
| 52147 || 9061 P-L || — || October 17, 1960 || Palomar || PLS || — || align=right | 2.9 km || 
|-id=148 bgcolor=#E9E9E9
| 52148 || 9506 P-L || — || October 17, 1960 || Palomar || PLS || RAF || align=right | 3.4 km || 
|-id=149 bgcolor=#d6d6d6
| 52149 || 1074 T-1 || — || March 25, 1971 || Palomar || PLS || — || align=right | 7.0 km || 
|-id=150 bgcolor=#E9E9E9
| 52150 || 1097 T-1 || — || March 25, 1971 || Palomar || PLS || RAF || align=right | 2.2 km || 
|-id=151 bgcolor=#fefefe
| 52151 || 1180 T-1 || — || March 25, 1971 || Palomar || PLS || FLO || align=right | 2.0 km || 
|-id=152 bgcolor=#E9E9E9
| 52152 || 1296 T-1 || — || March 25, 1971 || Palomar || PLS || — || align=right | 3.5 km || 
|-id=153 bgcolor=#E9E9E9
| 52153 || 2043 T-1 || — || March 25, 1971 || Palomar || PLS || — || align=right | 3.2 km || 
|-id=154 bgcolor=#d6d6d6
| 52154 || 2152 T-1 || — || March 25, 1971 || Palomar || PLS || — || align=right | 6.9 km || 
|-id=155 bgcolor=#E9E9E9
| 52155 || 2236 T-1 || — || March 25, 1971 || Palomar || PLS || — || align=right | 4.9 km || 
|-id=156 bgcolor=#fefefe
| 52156 || 4100 T-1 || — || March 26, 1971 || Palomar || PLS || NYS || align=right | 2.0 km || 
|-id=157 bgcolor=#d6d6d6
| 52157 || 4126 T-1 || — || March 26, 1971 || Palomar || PLS || HYG || align=right | 7.5 km || 
|-id=158 bgcolor=#fefefe
| 52158 || 4175 T-1 || — || March 26, 1971 || Palomar || PLS || MAS || align=right | 1.8 km || 
|-id=159 bgcolor=#fefefe
| 52159 || 4178 T-1 || — || March 26, 1971 || Palomar || PLS || NYS || align=right | 1.9 km || 
|-id=160 bgcolor=#fefefe
| 52160 || 4229 T-1 || — || March 26, 1971 || Palomar || PLS || — || align=right | 2.9 km || 
|-id=161 bgcolor=#E9E9E9
| 52161 || 4302 T-1 || — || March 26, 1971 || Palomar || PLS || — || align=right | 3.2 km || 
|-id=162 bgcolor=#d6d6d6
| 52162 || 4357 T-1 || — || March 26, 1971 || Palomar || PLS || THM || align=right | 8.6 km || 
|-id=163 bgcolor=#E9E9E9
| 52163 || 1004 T-2 || — || September 29, 1973 || Palomar || PLS || — || align=right | 4.7 km || 
|-id=164 bgcolor=#E9E9E9
| 52164 || 1012 T-2 || — || September 29, 1973 || Palomar || PLS || — || align=right | 2.1 km || 
|-id=165 bgcolor=#fefefe
| 52165 || 1099 T-2 || — || September 29, 1973 || Palomar || PLS || — || align=right | 1.6 km || 
|-id=166 bgcolor=#E9E9E9
| 52166 || 1184 T-2 || — || September 29, 1973 || Palomar || PLS || — || align=right | 4.7 km || 
|-id=167 bgcolor=#d6d6d6
| 52167 || 1220 T-2 || — || September 29, 1973 || Palomar || PLS || THM || align=right | 7.4 km || 
|-id=168 bgcolor=#fefefe
| 52168 || 1305 T-2 || — || September 29, 1973 || Palomar || PLS || V || align=right | 1.7 km || 
|-id=169 bgcolor=#E9E9E9
| 52169 || 1494 T-2 || — || September 29, 1973 || Palomar || PLS || — || align=right | 2.3 km || 
|-id=170 bgcolor=#fefefe
| 52170 || 2046 T-2 || — || September 29, 1973 || Palomar || PLS || — || align=right | 1.9 km || 
|-id=171 bgcolor=#E9E9E9
| 52171 || 2127 T-2 || — || September 29, 1973 || Palomar || PLS || — || align=right | 2.5 km || 
|-id=172 bgcolor=#d6d6d6
| 52172 || 2166 T-2 || — || September 29, 1973 || Palomar || PLS || — || align=right | 10 km || 
|-id=173 bgcolor=#d6d6d6
| 52173 || 2178 T-2 || — || September 29, 1973 || Palomar || PLS || KOR || align=right | 3.6 km || 
|-id=174 bgcolor=#E9E9E9
| 52174 || 2183 T-2 || — || September 29, 1973 || Palomar || PLS || — || align=right | 3.1 km || 
|-id=175 bgcolor=#d6d6d6
| 52175 || 2204 T-2 || — || September 29, 1973 || Palomar || PLS || — || align=right | 6.9 km || 
|-id=176 bgcolor=#d6d6d6
| 52176 || 2233 T-2 || — || September 29, 1973 || Palomar || PLS || KOR || align=right | 3.5 km || 
|-id=177 bgcolor=#d6d6d6
| 52177 || 2235 T-2 || — || September 29, 1973 || Palomar || PLS || — || align=right | 7.1 km || 
|-id=178 bgcolor=#E9E9E9
| 52178 || 2244 T-2 || — || September 29, 1973 || Palomar || PLS || — || align=right | 2.5 km || 
|-id=179 bgcolor=#d6d6d6
| 52179 || 2270 T-2 || — || September 29, 1973 || Palomar || PLS || KOR || align=right | 3.0 km || 
|-id=180 bgcolor=#d6d6d6
| 52180 || 2273 T-2 || — || September 29, 1973 || Palomar || PLS || HYG || align=right | 6.1 km || 
|-id=181 bgcolor=#E9E9E9
| 52181 || 3112 T-2 || — || September 30, 1973 || Palomar || PLS || RAF || align=right | 1.9 km || 
|-id=182 bgcolor=#d6d6d6
| 52182 || 3130 T-2 || — || September 30, 1973 || Palomar || PLS || — || align=right | 9.1 km || 
|-id=183 bgcolor=#fefefe
| 52183 || 3286 T-2 || — || September 30, 1973 || Palomar || PLS || V || align=right | 1.5 km || 
|-id=184 bgcolor=#d6d6d6
| 52184 || 3361 T-2 || — || September 25, 1973 || Palomar || PLS || — || align=right | 4.0 km || 
|-id=185 bgcolor=#E9E9E9
| 52185 || 3370 T-2 || — || September 25, 1973 || Palomar || PLS || — || align=right | 2.4 km || 
|-id=186 bgcolor=#fefefe
| 52186 || 4072 T-2 || — || September 29, 1973 || Palomar || PLS || FLO || align=right | 1.2 km || 
|-id=187 bgcolor=#d6d6d6
| 52187 || 4125 T-2 || — || September 29, 1973 || Palomar || PLS || — || align=right | 9.7 km || 
|-id=188 bgcolor=#E9E9E9
| 52188 || 4142 T-2 || — || September 29, 1973 || Palomar || PLS || MIT || align=right | 5.2 km || 
|-id=189 bgcolor=#E9E9E9
| 52189 || 4215 T-2 || — || September 29, 1973 || Palomar || PLS || — || align=right | 2.2 km || 
|-id=190 bgcolor=#d6d6d6
| 52190 || 4241 T-2 || — || September 29, 1973 || Palomar || PLS || — || align=right | 5.5 km || 
|-id=191 bgcolor=#fefefe
| 52191 || 4263 T-2 || — || September 29, 1973 || Palomar || PLS || NYS || align=right | 1.6 km || 
|-id=192 bgcolor=#E9E9E9
| 52192 || 5053 T-2 || — || September 25, 1973 || Palomar || PLS || — || align=right | 3.4 km || 
|-id=193 bgcolor=#d6d6d6
| 52193 || 5209 T-2 || — || September 25, 1973 || Palomar || PLS || — || align=right | 7.9 km || 
|-id=194 bgcolor=#d6d6d6
| 52194 || 1149 T-3 || — || October 17, 1977 || Palomar || PLS || SYL7:4 || align=right | 11 km || 
|-id=195 bgcolor=#fefefe
| 52195 || 2061 T-3 || — || October 16, 1977 || Palomar || PLS || — || align=right | 1.5 km || 
|-id=196 bgcolor=#E9E9E9
| 52196 || 2075 T-3 || — || October 16, 1977 || Palomar || PLS || — || align=right | 3.0 km || 
|-id=197 bgcolor=#d6d6d6
| 52197 || 2373 T-3 || — || October 16, 1977 || Palomar || PLS || CHA || align=right | 3.3 km || 
|-id=198 bgcolor=#E9E9E9
| 52198 || 2389 T-3 || — || October 16, 1977 || Palomar || PLS || — || align=right | 4.0 km || 
|-id=199 bgcolor=#fefefe
| 52199 || 2465 T-3 || — || October 16, 1977 || Palomar || PLS || — || align=right | 1.9 km || 
|-id=200 bgcolor=#E9E9E9
| 52200 || 3094 T-3 || — || October 16, 1977 || Palomar || PLS || — || align=right | 2.6 km || 
|}

52201–52300 

|-bgcolor=#E9E9E9
| 52201 || 3098 T-3 || — || October 16, 1977 || Palomar || PLS || — || align=right | 2.1 km || 
|-id=202 bgcolor=#d6d6d6
| 52202 || 3124 T-3 || — || October 16, 1977 || Palomar || PLS || KOR || align=right | 3.7 km || 
|-id=203 bgcolor=#E9E9E9
| 52203 || 3160 T-3 || — || October 16, 1977 || Palomar || PLS || — || align=right | 2.8 km || 
|-id=204 bgcolor=#d6d6d6
| 52204 || 3219 T-3 || — || October 16, 1977 || Palomar || PLS || KOR || align=right | 3.4 km || 
|-id=205 bgcolor=#fefefe
| 52205 || 3247 T-3 || — || October 16, 1977 || Palomar || PLS || NYS || align=right | 1.3 km || 
|-id=206 bgcolor=#fefefe
| 52206 || 3326 T-3 || — || October 16, 1977 || Palomar || PLS || — || align=right | 2.5 km || 
|-id=207 bgcolor=#E9E9E9
| 52207 || 3403 T-3 || — || October 16, 1977 || Palomar || PLS || — || align=right | 3.9 km || 
|-id=208 bgcolor=#E9E9E9
| 52208 || 3423 T-3 || — || October 16, 1977 || Palomar || PLS || — || align=right | 2.2 km || 
|-id=209 bgcolor=#E9E9E9
| 52209 || 3495 T-3 || — || October 16, 1977 || Palomar || PLS || — || align=right | 3.3 km || 
|-id=210 bgcolor=#fefefe
| 52210 || 4032 T-3 || — || October 16, 1977 || Palomar || PLS || — || align=right | 2.3 km || 
|-id=211 bgcolor=#E9E9E9
| 52211 || 4049 T-3 || — || October 16, 1977 || Palomar || PLS || — || align=right | 3.3 km || 
|-id=212 bgcolor=#fefefe
| 52212 || 4056 T-3 || — || October 16, 1977 || Palomar || PLS || V || align=right | 1.4 km || 
|-id=213 bgcolor=#fefefe
| 52213 || 4181 T-3 || — || October 16, 1977 || Palomar || PLS || — || align=right | 1.8 km || 
|-id=214 bgcolor=#E9E9E9
| 52214 || 4196 T-3 || — || October 16, 1977 || Palomar || PLS || — || align=right | 2.7 km || 
|-id=215 bgcolor=#fefefe
| 52215 || 4213 T-3 || — || October 16, 1977 || Palomar || PLS || — || align=right | 1.7 km || 
|-id=216 bgcolor=#fefefe
| 52216 || 5014 T-3 || — || October 16, 1977 || Palomar || PLS || — || align=right | 2.2 km || 
|-id=217 bgcolor=#E9E9E9
| 52217 || 5035 T-3 || — || October 16, 1977 || Palomar || PLS || — || align=right | 3.8 km || 
|-id=218 bgcolor=#fefefe
| 52218 || 5050 T-3 || — || October 16, 1977 || Palomar || PLS || — || align=right | 2.9 km || 
|-id=219 bgcolor=#fefefe
| 52219 || 5071 T-3 || — || October 16, 1977 || Palomar || PLS || — || align=right | 1.8 km || 
|-id=220 bgcolor=#fefefe
| 52220 || 5082 T-3 || — || October 16, 1977 || Palomar || PLS || — || align=right | 2.2 km || 
|-id=221 bgcolor=#E9E9E9
| 52221 || 5103 T-3 || — || October 16, 1977 || Palomar || PLS || KAZ || align=right | 5.4 km || 
|-id=222 bgcolor=#E9E9E9
| 52222 || 5111 T-3 || — || October 16, 1977 || Palomar || PLS || MAR || align=right | 3.2 km || 
|-id=223 bgcolor=#E9E9E9
| 52223 || 5158 T-3 || — || October 16, 1977 || Palomar || PLS || HNS || align=right | 2.4 km || 
|-id=224 bgcolor=#d6d6d6
| 52224 || 5602 T-3 || — || October 16, 1977 || Palomar || PLS || — || align=right | 4.1 km || 
|-id=225 bgcolor=#d6d6d6
| 52225 Panchenko ||  ||  || July 25, 1968 || Cerro El Roble || G. A. Plyugin, Yu. A. Belyaev || — || align=right | 11 km || 
|-id=226 bgcolor=#E9E9E9
| 52226 Saenredam || 1974 PA ||  || August 12, 1974 || Palomar || T. Gehrels || — || align=right | 5.1 km || 
|-id=227 bgcolor=#fefefe
| 52227 ||  || — || September 30, 1975 || Palomar || S. J. Bus || NYS || align=right | 1.6 km || 
|-id=228 bgcolor=#d6d6d6
| 52228 Protos || 1977 RN ||  || September 5, 1977 || La Silla || L. D. Schmadel || Tj (2.99) || align=right | 5.6 km || 
|-id=229 bgcolor=#E9E9E9
| 52229 || 1978 NN || — || July 10, 1978 || Palomar || E. F. Helin, E. M. Shoemaker || PAL || align=right | 8.7 km || 
|-id=230 bgcolor=#fefefe
| 52230 || 1978 NR || — || July 10, 1978 || Palomar || E. F. Helin, E. M. Shoemaker || — || align=right | 2.8 km || 
|-id=231 bgcolor=#fefefe
| 52231 Sitnik ||  ||  || September 5, 1978 || Nauchnij || N. S. Chernykh || — || align=right | 2.6 km || 
|-id=232 bgcolor=#fefefe
| 52232 ||  || — || October 27, 1978 || Palomar || C. M. Olmstead || — || align=right | 1.5 km || 
|-id=233 bgcolor=#d6d6d6
| 52233 ||  || — || October 27, 1978 || Palomar || C. M. Olmstead || — || align=right | 9.7 km || 
|-id=234 bgcolor=#E9E9E9
| 52234 ||  || — || October 27, 1978 || Palomar || C. M. Olmstead || — || align=right | 2.6 km || 
|-id=235 bgcolor=#d6d6d6
| 52235 ||  || — || June 25, 1979 || Siding Spring || E. F. Helin, S. J. Bus || — || align=right | 10 km || 
|-id=236 bgcolor=#d6d6d6
| 52236 ||  || — || June 25, 1979 || Siding Spring || E. F. Helin, S. J. Bus || — || align=right | 6.6 km || 
|-id=237 bgcolor=#E9E9E9
| 52237 ||  || — || July 24, 1979 || Palomar || S. J. Bus || — || align=right | 8.1 km || 
|-id=238 bgcolor=#E9E9E9
| 52238 ||  || — || July 24, 1979 || Siding Spring || S. J. Bus || — || align=right | 4.5 km || 
|-id=239 bgcolor=#E9E9E9
| 52239 ||  || — || July 24, 1979 || Siding Spring || S. J. Bus || — || align=right | 4.9 km || 
|-id=240 bgcolor=#fefefe
| 52240 ||  || — || March 16, 1980 || La Silla || C.-I. Lagerkvist || FLO || align=right | 1.2 km || 
|-id=241 bgcolor=#E9E9E9
| 52241 ||  || — || August 4, 1980 || Siding Spring || Edinburgh Obs. || — || align=right | 2.9 km || 
|-id=242 bgcolor=#E9E9E9
| 52242 Michelemaoret || 1981 EX ||  || March 3, 1981 || La Silla || H. Debehogne, G. DeSanctis || — || align=right | 6.1 km || 
|-id=243 bgcolor=#d6d6d6
| 52243 ||  || — || March 2, 1981 || Siding Spring || S. J. Bus || — || align=right | 5.1 km || 
|-id=244 bgcolor=#d6d6d6
| 52244 ||  || — || March 2, 1981 || Siding Spring || S. J. Bus || — || align=right | 6.8 km || 
|-id=245 bgcolor=#E9E9E9
| 52245 ||  || — || March 2, 1981 || Siding Spring || S. J. Bus || — || align=right | 3.3 km || 
|-id=246 bgcolor=#fefefe
| 52246 Donaldjohanson ||  ||  || March 2, 1981 || Siding Spring || S. J. Bus || ERI || align=right | 3.9 km || 
|-id=247 bgcolor=#fefefe
| 52247 ||  || — || March 1, 1981 || Siding Spring || S. J. Bus || V || align=right | 1.6 km || 
|-id=248 bgcolor=#E9E9E9
| 52248 ||  || — || March 1, 1981 || Siding Spring || S. J. Bus || — || align=right | 4.4 km || 
|-id=249 bgcolor=#E9E9E9
| 52249 ||  || — || March 2, 1981 || Siding Spring || S. J. Bus || — || align=right | 6.0 km || 
|-id=250 bgcolor=#fefefe
| 52250 ||  || — || March 6, 1981 || Siding Spring || S. J. Bus || V || align=right | 1.4 km || 
|-id=251 bgcolor=#fefefe
| 52251 ||  || — || March 6, 1981 || Siding Spring || S. J. Bus || — || align=right | 2.5 km || 
|-id=252 bgcolor=#fefefe
| 52252 ||  || — || March 2, 1981 || Siding Spring || S. J. Bus || ERI || align=right | 3.3 km || 
|-id=253 bgcolor=#d6d6d6
| 52253 ||  || — || March 3, 1981 || Siding Spring || S. J. Bus || THM || align=right | 5.6 km || 
|-id=254 bgcolor=#fefefe
| 52254 ||  || — || March 7, 1981 || Siding Spring || S. J. Bus || NYS || align=right | 2.1 km || 
|-id=255 bgcolor=#fefefe
| 52255 ||  || — || March 1, 1981 || Siding Spring || S. J. Bus || FLO || align=right | 1.7 km || 
|-id=256 bgcolor=#E9E9E9
| 52256 ||  || — || March 1, 1981 || Siding Spring || S. J. Bus || MRX || align=right | 2.2 km || 
|-id=257 bgcolor=#d6d6d6
| 52257 ||  || — || March 2, 1981 || Siding Spring || S. J. Bus || — || align=right | 7.4 km || 
|-id=258 bgcolor=#E9E9E9
| 52258 ||  || — || March 6, 1981 || Siding Spring || S. J. Bus || GEF || align=right | 2.7 km || 
|-id=259 bgcolor=#E9E9E9
| 52259 ||  || — || March 3, 1981 || Siding Spring || S. J. Bus || — || align=right | 3.5 km || 
|-id=260 bgcolor=#fefefe
| 52260 Ureshino || 1982 KA ||  || May 22, 1982 || Kiso || H. Kosai, K. Furukawa || — || align=right | 4.1 km || 
|-id=261 bgcolor=#d6d6d6
| 52261 Izumishikibu ||  ||  || November 14, 1982 || Kiso || H. Kosai, K. Furukawa || — || align=right | 4.8 km || 
|-id=262 bgcolor=#d6d6d6
| 52262 || 1983 QV || — || August 30, 1983 || Palomar || J. Gibson || — || align=right | 6.3 km || 
|-id=263 bgcolor=#E9E9E9
| 52263 ||  || — || August 24, 1985 || Nauchnij || N. S. Chernykh || — || align=right | 3.4 km || 
|-id=264 bgcolor=#fefefe
| 52264 ||  || — || September 13, 1985 || Palomar || E. F. Helin || — || align=right | 6.4 km || 
|-id=265 bgcolor=#fefefe
| 52265 ||  || — || September 7, 1985 || La Silla || H. Debehogne || — || align=right | 4.0 km || 
|-id=266 bgcolor=#fefefe
| 52266 Van Flandern || 1986 AD ||  || January 10, 1986 || Palomar || C. S. Shoemaker, E. M. Shoemaker || PHO || align=right | 3.5 km || 
|-id=267 bgcolor=#E9E9E9
| 52267 Rotarytorino ||  ||  || March 4, 1986 || La Silla || W. Ferreri || VIB || align=right | 3.5 km || 
|-id=268 bgcolor=#E9E9E9
| 52268 || 1986 WU || — || November 25, 1986 || Kleť || A. Mrkos || — || align=right | 5.0 km || 
|-id=269 bgcolor=#fefefe
| 52269 || 1988 CU || — || February 13, 1988 || Yorii || M. Arai, H. Mori || PHO || align=right | 5.7 km || 
|-id=270 bgcolor=#fefefe
| 52270 Noamchomsky ||  ||  || February 13, 1988 || La Silla || E. W. Elst || V || align=right | 1.8 km || 
|-id=271 bgcolor=#E9E9E9
| 52271 Lecorbusier ||  ||  || September 8, 1988 || Tautenburg Observatory || F. Börngen || EUN || align=right | 4.9 km || 
|-id=272 bgcolor=#E9E9E9
| 52272 ||  || — || September 2, 1988 || La Silla || H. Debehogne || ADE || align=right | 10 km || 
|-id=273 bgcolor=#C2FFFF
| 52273 ||  || — || September 14, 1988 || Cerro Tololo || S. J. Bus || L5 || align=right | 17 km || 
|-id=274 bgcolor=#E9E9E9
| 52274 ||  || — || September 14, 1988 || Cerro Tololo || S. J. Bus || — || align=right | 2.5 km || 
|-id=275 bgcolor=#C2FFFF
| 52275 ||  || — || September 14, 1988 || Cerro Tololo || S. J. Bus || L5 || align=right | 18 km || 
|-id=276 bgcolor=#E9E9E9
| 52276 ||  || — || September 14, 1988 || Cerro Tololo || S. J. Bus || — || align=right | 5.7 km || 
|-id=277 bgcolor=#E9E9E9
| 52277 ||  || — || September 16, 1988 || Cerro Tololo || S. J. Bus || — || align=right | 3.6 km || 
|-id=278 bgcolor=#C2FFFF
| 52278 ||  || — || September 16, 1988 || Cerro Tololo || S. J. Bus || L5 || align=right | 20 km || 
|-id=279 bgcolor=#E9E9E9
| 52279 ||  || — || February 4, 1989 || La Silla || E. W. Elst || DOR || align=right | 6.5 km || 
|-id=280 bgcolor=#E9E9E9
| 52280 || 1989 RB || — || September 5, 1989 || Palomar || E. F. Helin || — || align=right | 7.0 km || 
|-id=281 bgcolor=#E9E9E9
| 52281 ||  || — || September 26, 1989 || La Silla || E. W. Elst || — || align=right | 2.6 km || 
|-id=282 bgcolor=#fefefe
| 52282 ||  || — || September 26, 1989 || La Silla || E. W. Elst || — || align=right | 2.0 km || 
|-id=283 bgcolor=#E9E9E9
| 52283 ||  || — || September 26, 1989 || La Silla || E. W. Elst || — || align=right | 2.9 km || 
|-id=284 bgcolor=#fefefe
| 52284 || 1990 HP || — || April 26, 1990 || Palomar || E. F. Helin || H || align=right | 2.1 km || 
|-id=285 bgcolor=#fefefe
| 52285 Kakurinji ||  ||  || July 30, 1990 || Geisei || T. Seki || NYS || align=right | 1.9 km || 
|-id=286 bgcolor=#fefefe
| 52286 ||  || — || August 22, 1990 || Palomar || H. E. Holt || NYS || align=right | 2.4 km || 
|-id=287 bgcolor=#fefefe
| 52287 ||  || — || August 23, 1990 || Palomar || H. E. Holt || NYS || align=right | 4.6 km || 
|-id=288 bgcolor=#d6d6d6
| 52288 ||  || — || August 16, 1990 || La Silla || E. W. Elst || THM || align=right | 7.9 km || 
|-id=289 bgcolor=#fefefe
| 52289 ||  || — || August 16, 1990 || La Silla || E. W. Elst || NYS || align=right | 2.1 km || 
|-id=290 bgcolor=#d6d6d6
| 52290 || 1990 SF || — || September 17, 1990 || Siding Spring || R. H. McNaught || — || align=right | 8.6 km || 
|-id=291 bgcolor=#d6d6d6
| 52291 Mott ||  ||  || October 10, 1990 || Tautenburg Observatory || F. Börngen, L. D. Schmadel || — || align=right | 5.0 km || 
|-id=292 bgcolor=#d6d6d6
| 52292 Kamdzhalov ||  ||  || October 10, 1990 || Tautenburg Observatory || L. D. Schmadel, F. Börngen || — || align=right | 5.9 km || 
|-id=293 bgcolor=#d6d6d6
| 52293 Mommsen ||  ||  || October 12, 1990 || Tautenburg Observatory || F. Börngen, L. D. Schmadel || — || align=right | 10 km || 
|-id=294 bgcolor=#fefefe
| 52294 Detlef ||  ||  || October 12, 1990 || Tautenburg Observatory || L. D. Schmadel, F. Börngen || NYS || align=right | 2.8 km || 
|-id=295 bgcolor=#E9E9E9
| 52295 Köppen ||  ||  || November 15, 1990 || La Silla || E. W. Elst || — || align=right | 2.0 km || 
|-id=296 bgcolor=#d6d6d6
| 52296 ||  || — || November 19, 1990 || La Silla || E. W. Elst || — || align=right | 11 km || 
|-id=297 bgcolor=#FA8072
| 52297 ||  || — || February 12, 1991 || Siding Spring || R. H. McNaught || — || align=right | 3.6 km || 
|-id=298 bgcolor=#E9E9E9
| 52298 ||  || — || April 8, 1991 || La Silla || E. W. Elst || — || align=right | 4.2 km || 
|-id=299 bgcolor=#fefefe
| 52299 ||  || — || July 12, 1991 || Palomar || H. E. Holt || FLO || align=right | 1.6 km || 
|-id=300 bgcolor=#E9E9E9
| 52300 ||  || — || July 4, 1991 || La Silla || H. Debehogne || — || align=right | 4.8 km || 
|}

52301–52400 

|-bgcolor=#fefefe
| 52301 Qumran ||  ||  || September 9, 1991 || Tautenburg Observatory || F. Börngen, L. D. Schmadel || — || align=right | 1.6 km || 
|-id=302 bgcolor=#fefefe
| 52302 ||  || — || September 12, 1991 || Palomar || H. E. Holt || FLO || align=right | 2.6 km || 
|-id=303 bgcolor=#fefefe
| 52303 ||  || — || September 10, 1991 || Palomar || H. E. Holt || — || align=right | 2.8 km || 
|-id=304 bgcolor=#fefefe
| 52304 ||  || — || September 12, 1991 || Palomar || H. E. Holt || — || align=right | 3.4 km || 
|-id=305 bgcolor=#fefefe
| 52305 ||  || — || September 10, 1991 || Palomar || H. E. Holt || V || align=right | 2.4 km || 
|-id=306 bgcolor=#fefefe
| 52306 ||  || — || September 14, 1991 || Palomar || H. E. Holt || V || align=right | 1.9 km || 
|-id=307 bgcolor=#fefefe
| 52307 ||  || — || October 12, 1991 || Palomar || J. Alu || — || align=right | 2.4 km || 
|-id=308 bgcolor=#d6d6d6
| 52308 Hanspeterröser ||  ||  || October 7, 1991 || Tautenburg Observatory || L. D. Schmadel, F. Börngen || — || align=right | 6.0 km || 
|-id=309 bgcolor=#E9E9E9
| 52309 Philnicolai ||  ||  || October 7, 1991 || Tautenburg Observatory || F. Börngen || — || align=right | 13 km || 
|-id=310 bgcolor=#FA8072
| 52310 || 1991 VJ || — || November 9, 1991 || Siding Spring || R. H. McNaught || — || align=right | 2.9 km || 
|-id=311 bgcolor=#d6d6d6
| 52311 ||  || — || November 4, 1991 || Kitt Peak || Spacewatch || EOS || align=right | 4.5 km || 
|-id=312 bgcolor=#d6d6d6
| 52312 ||  || — || November 4, 1991 || Kitt Peak || Spacewatch || KOR || align=right | 3.0 km || 
|-id=313 bgcolor=#fefefe
| 52313 ||  || — || November 4, 1991 || Kitt Peak || Spacewatch || — || align=right | 1.7 km || 
|-id=314 bgcolor=#fefefe
| 52314 || 1991 XD || — || December 7, 1991 || Palomar || E. F. Helin || H || align=right | 3.1 km || 
|-id=315 bgcolor=#fefefe
| 52315 || 1992 AM || — || January 9, 1992 || Palomar || E. F. Helin || PHO || align=right | 3.3 km || 
|-id=316 bgcolor=#fefefe
| 52316 Daveslater || 1992 BD ||  || January 29, 1992 || Kitt Peak || Spacewatch || Hmoon || align=right | 2.7 km || 
|-id=317 bgcolor=#FA8072
| 52317 ||  || — || January 30, 1992 || Palomar || E. F. Helin || — || align=right | 4.0 km || 
|-id=318 bgcolor=#fefefe
| 52318 ||  || — || January 26, 1992 || Kitt Peak || Spacewatch || — || align=right | 3.7 km || 
|-id=319 bgcolor=#E9E9E9
| 52319 ||  || — || February 29, 1992 || La Silla || UESAC || — || align=right | 2.6 km || 
|-id=320 bgcolor=#d6d6d6
| 52320 ||  || — || February 29, 1992 || La Silla || UESAC || HYG || align=right | 6.1 km || 
|-id=321 bgcolor=#d6d6d6
| 52321 ||  || — || February 29, 1992 || La Silla || UESAC || — || align=right | 5.6 km || 
|-id=322 bgcolor=#fefefe
| 52322 ||  || — || February 29, 1992 || La Silla || UESAC || — || align=right | 2.6 km || 
|-id=323 bgcolor=#d6d6d6
| 52323 ||  || — || February 29, 1992 || La Silla || UESAC || — || align=right | 9.6 km || 
|-id=324 bgcolor=#fefefe
| 52324 ||  || — || February 29, 1992 || La Silla || UESAC || — || align=right | 1.8 km || 
|-id=325 bgcolor=#fefefe
| 52325 ||  || — || March 6, 1992 || Kitt Peak || Spacewatch || — || align=right | 1.8 km || 
|-id=326 bgcolor=#d6d6d6
| 52326 ||  || — || March 1, 1992 || La Silla || UESAC || — || align=right | 8.8 km || 
|-id=327 bgcolor=#fefefe
| 52327 ||  || — || March 2, 1992 || La Silla || UESAC || NYS || align=right | 1.5 km || 
|-id=328 bgcolor=#fefefe
| 52328 ||  || — || March 6, 1992 || La Silla || UESAC || — || align=right | 1.9 km || 
|-id=329 bgcolor=#fefefe
| 52329 ||  || — || March 1, 1992 || La Silla || UESAC || NYS || align=right | 4.9 km || 
|-id=330 bgcolor=#fefefe
| 52330 ||  || — || March 1, 1992 || La Silla || UESAC || — || align=right | 3.3 km || 
|-id=331 bgcolor=#fefefe
| 52331 ||  || — || March 1, 1992 || La Silla || UESAC || PHO || align=right | 2.9 km || 
|-id=332 bgcolor=#fefefe
| 52332 ||  || — || March 1, 1992 || La Silla || UESAC || — || align=right | 2.7 km || 
|-id=333 bgcolor=#fefefe
| 52333 ||  || — || March 1, 1992 || La Silla || UESAC || NYS || align=right | 2.0 km || 
|-id=334 bgcolor=#fefefe
| 52334 Oberammergau ||  ||  || March 30, 1992 || Tautenburg Observatory || F. Börngen || NYS || align=right | 5.1 km || 
|-id=335 bgcolor=#fefefe
| 52335 || 1992 HO || — || April 23, 1992 || Kitt Peak || Spacewatch || NYS || align=right | 1.8 km || 
|-id=336 bgcolor=#E9E9E9
| 52336 ||  || — || July 26, 1992 || La Silla || E. W. Elst || — || align=right | 3.4 km || 
|-id=337 bgcolor=#fefefe
| 52337 Compton || 1992 RS ||  || September 2, 1992 || Tautenburg Observatory || F. Börngen, L. D. Schmadel || EUT || align=right | 2.1 km || 
|-id=338 bgcolor=#E9E9E9
| 52338 ||  || — || September 2, 1992 || Siding Spring || R. H. McNaught || HNS || align=right | 3.5 km || 
|-id=339 bgcolor=#E9E9E9
| 52339 ||  || — || September 2, 1992 || La Silla || E. W. Elst || — || align=right | 4.0 km || 
|-id=340 bgcolor=#FFC2E0
| 52340 || 1992 SY || — || September 27, 1992 || Kitt Peak || Spacewatch || APO +1kmcritical || align=right data-sort-value="0.98" | 980 m || 
|-id=341 bgcolor=#E9E9E9
| 52341 Ballmann ||  ||  || September 21, 1992 || Tautenburg Observatory || L. D. Schmadel, F. Börngen || — || align=right | 5.7 km || 
|-id=342 bgcolor=#E9E9E9
| 52342 ||  || — || September 22, 1992 || La Silla || E. W. Elst || — || align=right | 6.1 km || 
|-id=343 bgcolor=#fefefe
| 52343 ||  || — || November 18, 1992 || Kushiro || S. Ueda, H. Kaneda || — || align=right | 2.4 km || 
|-id=344 bgcolor=#d6d6d6
| 52344 Yehudimenuhin ||  ||  || December 18, 1992 || Caussols || E. W. Elst || ALA || align=right | 13 km || 
|-id=345 bgcolor=#fefefe
| 52345 ||  || — || March 20, 1993 || Kitami || K. Endate, K. Watanabe || PHO || align=right | 8.6 km || 
|-id=346 bgcolor=#fefefe
| 52346 ||  || — || March 17, 1993 || La Silla || UESAC || — || align=right | 6.7 km || 
|-id=347 bgcolor=#fefefe
| 52347 ||  || — || March 17, 1993 || La Silla || UESAC || — || align=right | 2.3 km || 
|-id=348 bgcolor=#fefefe
| 52348 ||  || — || March 17, 1993 || La Silla || UESAC || NYS || align=right | 1.7 km || 
|-id=349 bgcolor=#fefefe
| 52349 ||  || — || March 17, 1993 || La Silla || UESAC || FLO || align=right | 1.5 km || 
|-id=350 bgcolor=#fefefe
| 52350 ||  || — || March 17, 1993 || La Silla || UESAC || NYS || align=right | 1.6 km || 
|-id=351 bgcolor=#d6d6d6
| 52351 ||  || — || March 17, 1993 || La Silla || UESAC || — || align=right | 5.4 km || 
|-id=352 bgcolor=#d6d6d6
| 52352 ||  || — || March 17, 1993 || La Silla || UESAC || HYG || align=right | 5.0 km || 
|-id=353 bgcolor=#d6d6d6
| 52353 ||  || — || March 17, 1993 || La Silla || UESAC || — || align=right | 5.6 km || 
|-id=354 bgcolor=#fefefe
| 52354 ||  || — || March 21, 1993 || La Silla || UESAC || FLO || align=right | 1.9 km || 
|-id=355 bgcolor=#fefefe
| 52355 ||  || — || March 21, 1993 || La Silla || UESAC || NYS || align=right | 1.6 km || 
|-id=356 bgcolor=#d6d6d6
| 52356 ||  || — || March 21, 1993 || La Silla || UESAC || HYG || align=right | 6.1 km || 
|-id=357 bgcolor=#fefefe
| 52357 ||  || — || March 21, 1993 || La Silla || UESAC || — || align=right | 2.3 km || 
|-id=358 bgcolor=#fefefe
| 52358 ||  || — || March 21, 1993 || La Silla || UESAC || — || align=right | 2.4 km || 
|-id=359 bgcolor=#fefefe
| 52359 ||  || — || March 21, 1993 || La Silla || UESAC || — || align=right | 3.1 km || 
|-id=360 bgcolor=#d6d6d6
| 52360 ||  || — || March 21, 1993 || La Silla || UESAC || — || align=right | 7.3 km || 
|-id=361 bgcolor=#fefefe
| 52361 ||  || — || March 21, 1993 || La Silla || UESAC || — || align=right | 1.3 km || 
|-id=362 bgcolor=#fefefe
| 52362 ||  || — || March 19, 1993 || La Silla || UESAC || — || align=right | 3.7 km || 
|-id=363 bgcolor=#d6d6d6
| 52363 ||  || — || March 19, 1993 || La Silla || UESAC || THM || align=right | 6.3 km || 
|-id=364 bgcolor=#d6d6d6
| 52364 ||  || — || March 19, 1993 || La Silla || UESAC || — || align=right | 6.8 km || 
|-id=365 bgcolor=#d6d6d6
| 52365 ||  || — || March 19, 1993 || La Silla || UESAC || — || align=right | 8.5 km || 
|-id=366 bgcolor=#d6d6d6
| 52366 ||  || — || March 19, 1993 || La Silla || UESAC || — || align=right | 9.6 km || 
|-id=367 bgcolor=#fefefe
| 52367 ||  || — || March 19, 1993 || La Silla || UESAC || — || align=right | 1.6 km || 
|-id=368 bgcolor=#d6d6d6
| 52368 ||  || — || March 21, 1993 || La Silla || UESAC || — || align=right | 7.8 km || 
|-id=369 bgcolor=#fefefe
| 52369 ||  || — || March 19, 1993 || La Silla || UESAC || — || align=right | 2.1 km || 
|-id=370 bgcolor=#fefefe
| 52370 ||  || — || March 19, 1993 || La Silla || UESAC || FLO || align=right | 1.8 km || 
|-id=371 bgcolor=#d6d6d6
| 52371 ||  || — || March 19, 1993 || La Silla || UESAC || — || align=right | 7.6 km || 
|-id=372 bgcolor=#d6d6d6
| 52372 ||  || — || March 19, 1993 || La Silla || UESAC || — || align=right | 8.2 km || 
|-id=373 bgcolor=#fefefe
| 52373 ||  || — || March 19, 1993 || La Silla || UESAC || — || align=right | 1.6 km || 
|-id=374 bgcolor=#fefefe
| 52374 ||  || — || March 19, 1993 || La Silla || UESAC || — || align=right | 1.8 km || 
|-id=375 bgcolor=#d6d6d6
| 52375 ||  || — || March 17, 1993 || La Silla || UESAC || — || align=right | 5.8 km || 
|-id=376 bgcolor=#fefefe
| 52376 ||  || — || March 21, 1993 || La Silla || UESAC || V || align=right | 1.5 km || 
|-id=377 bgcolor=#fefefe
| 52377 ||  || — || March 21, 1993 || La Silla || UESAC || V || align=right | 1.6 km || 
|-id=378 bgcolor=#fefefe
| 52378 ||  || — || March 18, 1993 || La Silla || UESAC || — || align=right | 1.4 km || 
|-id=379 bgcolor=#fefefe
| 52379 ||  || — || March 18, 1993 || La Silla || UESAC || — || align=right | 2.3 km || 
|-id=380 bgcolor=#fefefe
| 52380 ||  || — || March 19, 1993 || Kitt Peak || Spacewatch || — || align=right | 1.6 km || 
|-id=381 bgcolor=#FFC2E0
| 52381 || 1993 HA || — || April 17, 1993 || Kitt Peak || Spacewatch || AMO || align=right data-sort-value="0.34" | 340 m || 
|-id=382 bgcolor=#fefefe
| 52382 ||  || — || April 16, 1993 || Kitami || K. Endate, K. Watanabe || — || align=right | 2.6 km || 
|-id=383 bgcolor=#fefefe
| 52383 ||  || — || April 19, 1993 || Kitt Peak || Spacewatch || — || align=right | 3.6 km || 
|-id=384 bgcolor=#FA8072
| 52384 Elenapanko ||  ||  || April 19, 1993 || Palomar || C. S. Shoemaker || H || align=right | 2.6 km || 
|-id=385 bgcolor=#fefefe
| 52385 || 1993 OC || — || July 16, 1993 || Palomar || E. F. Helin || PHO || align=right | 3.7 km || 
|-id=386 bgcolor=#fefefe
| 52386 ||  || — || July 20, 1993 || La Silla || E. W. Elst || NYS || align=right | 4.0 km || 
|-id=387 bgcolor=#FFC2E0
| 52387 Huitzilopochtli ||  ||  || July 20, 1993 || La Silla || E. W. Elst || AMO +1km || align=right data-sort-value="0.89" | 890 m || 
|-id=388 bgcolor=#fefefe
| 52388 ||  || — || August 15, 1993 || Caussols || E. W. Elst || — || align=right | 2.9 km || 
|-id=389 bgcolor=#E9E9E9
| 52389 ||  || — || August 15, 1993 || Caussols || E. W. Elst || — || align=right | 2.6 km || 
|-id=390 bgcolor=#E9E9E9
| 52390 ||  || — || August 18, 1993 || Caussols || E. W. Elst || EUN || align=right | 3.7 km || 
|-id=391 bgcolor=#E9E9E9
| 52391 ||  || — || August 17, 1993 || Caussols || E. W. Elst || — || align=right | 3.7 km || 
|-id=392 bgcolor=#E9E9E9
| 52392 ||  || — || September 15, 1993 || La Silla || E. W. Elst || — || align=right | 3.2 km || 
|-id=393 bgcolor=#E9E9E9
| 52393 ||  || — || September 15, 1993 || La Silla || E. W. Elst || — || align=right | 2.4 km || 
|-id=394 bgcolor=#E9E9E9
| 52394 ||  || — || September 15, 1993 || La Silla || E. W. Elst || — || align=right | 5.3 km || 
|-id=395 bgcolor=#E9E9E9
| 52395 ||  || — || September 15, 1993 || La Silla || E. W. Elst || — || align=right | 3.4 km || 
|-id=396 bgcolor=#E9E9E9
| 52396 ||  || — || September 15, 1993 || La Silla || E. W. Elst || — || align=right | 2.6 km || 
|-id=397 bgcolor=#E9E9E9
| 52397 ||  || — || September 15, 1993 || La Silla || E. W. Elst || — || align=right | 2.9 km || 
|-id=398 bgcolor=#E9E9E9
| 52398 ||  || — || September 15, 1993 || La Silla || E. W. Elst || — || align=right | 3.1 km || 
|-id=399 bgcolor=#E9E9E9
| 52399 ||  || — || September 15, 1993 || La Silla || H. Debehogne, E. W. Elst || RAF || align=right | 2.7 km || 
|-id=400 bgcolor=#E9E9E9
| 52400 ||  || — || September 16, 1993 || La Silla || H. Debehogne, E. W. Elst || — || align=right | 2.5 km || 
|}

52401–52500 

|-bgcolor=#E9E9E9
| 52401 ||  || — || September 19, 1993 || Palomar || H. E. Holt || — || align=right | 4.4 km || 
|-id=402 bgcolor=#E9E9E9
| 52402 || 1993 TL || — || October 8, 1993 || Kitami || K. Endate, K. Watanabe || — || align=right | 3.0 km || 
|-id=403 bgcolor=#E9E9E9
| 52403 ||  || — || October 9, 1993 || La Silla || E. W. Elst || PAD || align=right | 5.4 km || 
|-id=404 bgcolor=#E9E9E9
| 52404 ||  || — || October 9, 1993 || La Silla || E. W. Elst || — || align=right | 2.3 km || 
|-id=405 bgcolor=#E9E9E9
| 52405 ||  || — || October 9, 1993 || La Silla || E. W. Elst || — || align=right | 2.8 km || 
|-id=406 bgcolor=#E9E9E9
| 52406 ||  || — || October 9, 1993 || La Silla || E. W. Elst || — || align=right | 1.6 km || 
|-id=407 bgcolor=#E9E9E9
| 52407 ||  || — || October 9, 1993 || La Silla || E. W. Elst || — || align=right | 2.3 km || 
|-id=408 bgcolor=#E9E9E9
| 52408 ||  || — || October 9, 1993 || La Silla || E. W. Elst || — || align=right | 4.3 km || 
|-id=409 bgcolor=#E9E9E9
| 52409 ||  || — || October 20, 1993 || La Silla || E. W. Elst || — || align=right | 2.9 km || 
|-id=410 bgcolor=#E9E9E9
| 52410 ||  || — || October 20, 1993 || La Silla || E. W. Elst || — || align=right | 4.8 km || 
|-id=411 bgcolor=#E9E9E9
| 52411 ||  || — || January 14, 1994 || Oizumi || T. Kobayashi || — || align=right | 4.2 km || 
|-id=412 bgcolor=#E9E9E9
| 52412 ||  || — || January 5, 1994 || Kitt Peak || Spacewatch || — || align=right | 4.9 km || 
|-id=413 bgcolor=#E9E9E9
| 52413 ||  || — || January 16, 1994 || Caussols || E. W. Elst, C. Pollas || NEM || align=right | 5.5 km || 
|-id=414 bgcolor=#E9E9E9
| 52414 ||  || — || February 8, 1994 || La Silla || E. W. Elst || — || align=right | 5.0 km || 
|-id=415 bgcolor=#E9E9E9
| 52415 ||  || — || March 9, 1994 || Caussols || E. W. Elst || CLO || align=right | 4.8 km || 
|-id=416 bgcolor=#d6d6d6
| 52416 ||  || — || April 6, 1994 || Kitt Peak || Spacewatch || ANF || align=right | 3.9 km || 
|-id=417 bgcolor=#d6d6d6
| 52417 ||  || — || April 6, 1994 || Kitt Peak || Spacewatch || — || align=right | 5.3 km || 
|-id=418 bgcolor=#d6d6d6
| 52418 ||  || — || April 14, 1994 || Palomar || PCAS || — || align=right | 8.2 km || 
|-id=419 bgcolor=#fefefe
| 52419 || 1994 HX || — || April 16, 1994 || Kitt Peak || Spacewatch || — || align=right | 1.1 km || 
|-id=420 bgcolor=#d6d6d6
| 52420 ||  || — || May 1, 1994 || Kitt Peak || Spacewatch || — || align=right | 7.2 km || 
|-id=421 bgcolor=#d6d6d6
| 52421 Daihoji || 1994 LA ||  || June 1, 1994 || Kuma Kogen || A. Nakamura || ALA || align=right | 9.6 km || 
|-id=422 bgcolor=#d6d6d6
| 52422 LPL || 1994 LP ||  || June 7, 1994 || Kitt Peak || Spacewatch || — || align=right | 9.9 km || 
|-id=423 bgcolor=#fefefe
| 52423 || 1994 LZ || — || June 11, 1994 || Palomar || E. F. Helin || — || align=right | 3.1 km || 
|-id=424 bgcolor=#fefefe
| 52424 ||  || — || June 3, 1994 || La Silla || H. Debehogne || — || align=right | 2.0 km || 
|-id=425 bgcolor=#fefefe
| 52425 ||  || — || June 8, 1994 || La Silla || H. Debehogne, E. W. Elst || — || align=right | 1.9 km || 
|-id=426 bgcolor=#fefefe
| 52426 || 1994 PF || — || August 5, 1994 || San Marcello || A. Boattini, M. Tombelli || FLO || align=right | 1.4 km || 
|-id=427 bgcolor=#fefefe
| 52427 || 1994 PH || — || August 2, 1994 || Nachi-Katsuura || Y. Shimizu, T. Urata || — || align=right | 2.6 km || 
|-id=428 bgcolor=#fefefe
| 52428 ||  || — || August 10, 1994 || La Silla || E. W. Elst || NYS || align=right | 4.0 km || 
|-id=429 bgcolor=#fefefe
| 52429 ||  || — || August 10, 1994 || La Silla || E. W. Elst || MAS || align=right | 1.6 km || 
|-id=430 bgcolor=#fefefe
| 52430 ||  || — || August 10, 1994 || La Silla || E. W. Elst || — || align=right | 1.7 km || 
|-id=431 bgcolor=#fefefe
| 52431 ||  || — || August 10, 1994 || La Silla || E. W. Elst || NYS || align=right | 4.5 km || 
|-id=432 bgcolor=#fefefe
| 52432 ||  || — || August 10, 1994 || La Silla || E. W. Elst || — || align=right | 2.4 km || 
|-id=433 bgcolor=#fefefe
| 52433 ||  || — || August 10, 1994 || La Silla || E. W. Elst || NYS || align=right | 1.4 km || 
|-id=434 bgcolor=#fefefe
| 52434 ||  || — || August 10, 1994 || La Silla || E. W. Elst || NYS || align=right | 1.6 km || 
|-id=435 bgcolor=#fefefe
| 52435 ||  || — || August 12, 1994 || La Silla || E. W. Elst || — || align=right | 3.7 km || 
|-id=436 bgcolor=#fefefe
| 52436 ||  || — || August 12, 1994 || La Silla || E. W. Elst || — || align=right | 2.4 km || 
|-id=437 bgcolor=#fefefe
| 52437 ||  || — || August 12, 1994 || La Silla || E. W. Elst || — || align=right | 1.8 km || 
|-id=438 bgcolor=#fefefe
| 52438 ||  || — || August 12, 1994 || La Silla || E. W. Elst || V || align=right | 1.7 km || 
|-id=439 bgcolor=#FA8072
| 52439 || 1994 QL || — || August 16, 1994 || Siding Spring || R. H. McNaught || H || align=right | 3.0 km || 
|-id=440 bgcolor=#fefefe
| 52440 || 1994 QN || — || August 26, 1994 || Siding Spring || R. H. McNaught || PHO || align=right | 3.2 km || 
|-id=441 bgcolor=#fefefe
| 52441 ||  || — || September 1, 1994 || Palomar || E. F. Helin || — || align=right | 2.3 km || 
|-id=442 bgcolor=#fefefe
| 52442 ||  || — || September 28, 1994 || Kitt Peak || Spacewatch || MAS || align=right | 2.2 km || 
|-id=443 bgcolor=#E9E9E9
| 52443 || 1994 TW || — || October 2, 1994 || Kitami || K. Endate, K. Watanabe || — || align=right | 3.2 km || 
|-id=444 bgcolor=#E9E9E9
| 52444 ||  || — || October 2, 1994 || Kitami || K. Endate, K. Watanabe || — || align=right | 2.4 km || 
|-id=445 bgcolor=#fefefe
| 52445 ||  || — || October 2, 1994 || Kitt Peak || Spacewatch || NYS || align=right | 1.4 km || 
|-id=446 bgcolor=#fefefe
| 52446 ||  || — || October 4, 1994 || Kitt Peak || Spacewatch || NYS || align=right | 4.2 km || 
|-id=447 bgcolor=#fefefe
| 52447 ||  || — || October 8, 1994 || Palomar || E. F. Helin || — || align=right | 5.8 km || 
|-id=448 bgcolor=#E9E9E9
| 52448 ||  || — || October 28, 1994 || Kitt Peak || Spacewatch || — || align=right | 1.8 km || 
|-id=449 bgcolor=#fefefe
| 52449 || 1994 VJ || — || November 1, 1994 || Oizumi || T. Kobayashi || NYS || align=right | 2.4 km || 
|-id=450 bgcolor=#E9E9E9
| 52450 || 1994 VL || — || November 1, 1994 || Oizumi || T. Kobayashi || — || align=right | 2.3 km || 
|-id=451 bgcolor=#E9E9E9
| 52451 || 1994 VU || — || November 3, 1994 || Oizumi || T. Kobayashi || — || align=right | 3.4 km || 
|-id=452 bgcolor=#E9E9E9
| 52452 ||  || — || November 3, 1994 || Oizumi || T. Kobayashi || — || align=right | 2.4 km || 
|-id=453 bgcolor=#FA8072
| 52453 || 1994 WC || — || November 23, 1994 || Oizumi || T. Kobayashi || — || align=right | 2.8 km || 
|-id=454 bgcolor=#fefefe
| 52454 ||  || — || November 26, 1994 || Kitt Peak || Spacewatch || V || align=right | 1.5 km || 
|-id=455 bgcolor=#E9E9E9
| 52455 Masamika ||  ||  || January 6, 1995 || Geisei || T. Seki || — || align=right | 4.0 km || 
|-id=456 bgcolor=#E9E9E9
| 52456 ||  || — || January 2, 1995 || Caussols || E. W. Elst || — || align=right | 5.0 km || 
|-id=457 bgcolor=#E9E9E9
| 52457 Enquist ||  ||  || January 2, 1995 || Caussols || E. W. Elst || — || align=right | 8.0 km || 
|-id=458 bgcolor=#E9E9E9
| 52458 ||  || — || January 26, 1995 || Oohira || T. Urata || — || align=right | 3.0 km || 
|-id=459 bgcolor=#E9E9E9
| 52459 || 1995 DS || — || February 21, 1995 || Stroncone || A. Vagnozzi || — || align=right | 2.9 km || 
|-id=460 bgcolor=#fefefe
| 52460 ||  || — || February 24, 1995 || Siding Spring || R. H. McNaught || H || align=right | 1.4 km || 
|-id=461 bgcolor=#E9E9E9
| 52461 ||  || — || February 22, 1995 || Kitt Peak || Spacewatch || MIS || align=right | 5.6 km || 
|-id=462 bgcolor=#E9E9E9
| 52462 ||  || — || March 27, 1995 || Kitt Peak || Spacewatch || — || align=right | 2.9 km || 
|-id=463 bgcolor=#E9E9E9
| 52463 ||  || — || April 6, 1995 || Kitt Peak || T. J. Balonek || — || align=right | 3.0 km || 
|-id=464 bgcolor=#d6d6d6
| 52464 ||  || — || June 23, 1995 || Kitt Peak || Spacewatch || — || align=right | 9.6 km || 
|-id=465 bgcolor=#E9E9E9
| 52465 ||  || — || July 22, 1995 || Kitt Peak || Spacewatch || — || align=right | 7.3 km || 
|-id=466 bgcolor=#d6d6d6
| 52466 ||  || — || July 22, 1995 || Kitt Peak || Spacewatch || — || align=right | 6.5 km || 
|-id=467 bgcolor=#d6d6d6
| 52467 ||  || — || July 22, 1995 || Kitt Peak || Spacewatch || — || align=right | 8.3 km || 
|-id=468 bgcolor=#d6d6d6
| 52468 ||  || — || August 19, 1995 || Xinglong || SCAP || — || align=right | 6.0 km || 
|-id=469 bgcolor=#fefefe
| 52469 ||  || — || August 20, 1995 || Nachi-Katsuura || Y. Shimizu, T. Urata || — || align=right | 2.1 km || 
|-id=470 bgcolor=#E9E9E9
| 52470 ||  || — || September 20, 1995 || Kushiro || S. Ueda, H. Kaneda || — || align=right | 3.8 km || 
|-id=471 bgcolor=#fefefe
| 52471 ||  || — || September 26, 1995 || Catalina Station || T. B. Spahr || PHO || align=right | 2.4 km || 
|-id=472 bgcolor=#d6d6d6
| 52472 ||  || — || September 17, 1995 || Kitt Peak || Spacewatch || — || align=right | 8.7 km || 
|-id=473 bgcolor=#d6d6d6
| 52473 ||  || — || September 18, 1995 || Kitt Peak || Spacewatch || — || align=right | 7.3 km || 
|-id=474 bgcolor=#fefefe
| 52474 ||  || — || September 21, 1995 || Kitt Peak || Spacewatch || — || align=right | 1.9 km || 
|-id=475 bgcolor=#d6d6d6
| 52475 ||  || — || September 25, 1995 || Kitt Peak || Spacewatch || — || align=right | 9.7 km || 
|-id=476 bgcolor=#fefefe
| 52476 ||  || — || September 29, 1995 || Kitt Peak || Spacewatch || — || align=right | 4.1 km || 
|-id=477 bgcolor=#d6d6d6
| 52477 ||  || — || September 21, 1995 || Kitt Peak || Spacewatch || EOS || align=right | 4.1 km || 
|-id=478 bgcolor=#fefefe
| 52478 || 1995 TO || — || October 12, 1995 || Sudbury || D. di Cicco || — || align=right | 2.2 km || 
|-id=479 bgcolor=#fefefe
| 52479 || 1995 TZ || — || October 13, 1995 || Chichibu || N. Satō, T. Urata || — || align=right | 5.0 km || 
|-id=480 bgcolor=#fefefe
| 52480 Enzomora ||  ||  || October 20, 1995 || Bologna || San Vittore Obs. || — || align=right | 1.6 km || 
|-id=481 bgcolor=#d6d6d6
| 52481 ||  || — || October 17, 1995 || Kitt Peak || Spacewatch || — || align=right | 9.0 km || 
|-id=482 bgcolor=#fefefe
| 52482 ||  || — || October 20, 1995 || Kitt Peak || Spacewatch || — || align=right | 1.9 km || 
|-id=483 bgcolor=#fefefe
| 52483 ||  || — || November 14, 1995 || Kitt Peak || Spacewatch || — || align=right | 4.1 km || 
|-id=484 bgcolor=#fefefe
| 52484 ||  || — || November 15, 1995 || Kitt Peak || Spacewatch || FLO || align=right | 1.4 km || 
|-id=485 bgcolor=#fefefe
| 52485 || 1995 WD || — || November 16, 1995 || Oizumi || T. Kobayashi || — || align=right | 2.4 km || 
|-id=486 bgcolor=#fefefe
| 52486 ||  || — || November 19, 1995 || Kitt Peak || Spacewatch || — || align=right | 1.3 km || 
|-id=487 bgcolor=#fefefe
| 52487 Huazhongkejida ||  ||  || December 6, 1995 || Xinglong || SCAP || fast? || align=right | 2.4 km || 
|-id=488 bgcolor=#fefefe
| 52488 ||  || — || December 14, 1995 || Kitt Peak || Spacewatch || — || align=right | 1.8 km || 
|-id=489 bgcolor=#fefefe
| 52489 ||  || — || December 26, 1995 || Oizumi || T. Kobayashi || — || align=right | 1.9 km || 
|-id=490 bgcolor=#fefefe
| 52490 ||  || — || December 16, 1995 || Kitt Peak || Spacewatch || — || align=right | 2.4 km || 
|-id=491 bgcolor=#fefefe
| 52491 ||  || — || December 18, 1995 || Kitt Peak || Spacewatch || — || align=right | 2.6 km || 
|-id=492 bgcolor=#fefefe
| 52492 ||  || — || December 18, 1995 || Kitt Peak || Spacewatch || NYS || align=right | 1.2 km || 
|-id=493 bgcolor=#fefefe
| 52493 ||  || — || December 22, 1995 || Kitt Peak || Spacewatch || — || align=right | 2.0 km || 
|-id=494 bgcolor=#fefefe
| 52494 ||  || — || January 13, 1996 || Kitt Peak || Spacewatch || V || align=right | 1.6 km || 
|-id=495 bgcolor=#fefefe
| 52495 ||  || — || January 13, 1996 || Kitt Peak || Spacewatch || — || align=right | 3.7 km || 
|-id=496 bgcolor=#fefefe
| 52496 ||  || — || January 13, 1996 || Kitt Peak || Spacewatch || NYS || align=right | 1.7 km || 
|-id=497 bgcolor=#fefefe
| 52497 ||  || — || January 15, 1996 || Kitt Peak || Spacewatch || V || align=right | 2.0 km || 
|-id=498 bgcolor=#fefefe
| 52498 ||  || — || January 19, 1996 || Kitt Peak || Spacewatch || — || align=right | 2.4 km || 
|-id=499 bgcolor=#fefefe
| 52499 ||  || — || February 11, 1996 || Oizumi || T. Kobayashi || — || align=right | 4.3 km || 
|-id=500 bgcolor=#fefefe
| 52500 Kanata ||  ||  || February 22, 1996 || Oizumi || T. Kobayashi || — || align=right | 3.5 km || 
|}

52501–52600 

|-bgcolor=#fefefe
| 52501 ||  || — || February 23, 1996 || Oizumi || T. Kobayashi || ERI || align=right | 6.3 km || 
|-id=502 bgcolor=#fefefe
| 52502 ||  || — || March 11, 1996 || Kitt Peak || Spacewatch || NYS || align=right | 1.9 km || 
|-id=503 bgcolor=#fefefe
| 52503 ||  || — || March 13, 1996 || Kitt Peak || Spacewatch || V || align=right | 1.6 km || 
|-id=504 bgcolor=#fefefe
| 52504 ||  || — || March 19, 1996 || Haleakala || NEAT || MAS || align=right | 1.5 km || 
|-id=505 bgcolor=#fefefe
| 52505 ||  || — || March 22, 1996 || Haleakala || AMOS || — || align=right | 2.8 km || 
|-id=506 bgcolor=#fefefe
| 52506 ||  || — || March 23, 1996 || Haleakala || AMOS || MAS || align=right | 1.5 km || 
|-id=507 bgcolor=#fefefe
| 52507 ||  || — || April 12, 1996 || Višnjan Observatory || Višnjan Obs. || NYS || align=right | 2.0 km || 
|-id=508 bgcolor=#fefefe
| 52508 ||  || — || April 11, 1996 || Kitt Peak || Spacewatch || NYS || align=right | 4.3 km || 
|-id=509 bgcolor=#E9E9E9
| 52509 ||  || — || April 13, 1996 || Kitt Peak || Spacewatch || — || align=right | 2.2 km || 
|-id=510 bgcolor=#E9E9E9
| 52510 ||  || — || April 13, 1996 || Kitt Peak || Spacewatch || — || align=right | 3.8 km || 
|-id=511 bgcolor=#C2FFFF
| 52511 ||  || — || April 15, 1996 || Kitt Peak || Spacewatch || L5 || align=right | 22 km || 
|-id=512 bgcolor=#E9E9E9
| 52512 ||  || — || April 15, 1996 || La Silla || E. W. Elst || — || align=right | 2.8 km || 
|-id=513 bgcolor=#fefefe
| 52513 ||  || — || April 13, 1996 || Kitt Peak || Spacewatch || — || align=right | 2.5 km || 
|-id=514 bgcolor=#E9E9E9
| 52514 ||  || — || April 17, 1996 || Kitt Peak || Spacewatch || — || align=right | 4.3 km || 
|-id=515 bgcolor=#fefefe
| 52515 ||  || — || April 17, 1996 || La Silla || E. W. Elst || MAS || align=right | 1.9 km || 
|-id=516 bgcolor=#fefefe
| 52516 ||  || — || April 18, 1996 || La Silla || E. W. Elst || NYS || align=right | 2.4 km || 
|-id=517 bgcolor=#E9E9E9
| 52517 ||  || — || April 20, 1996 || La Silla || E. W. Elst || — || align=right | 4.5 km || 
|-id=518 bgcolor=#E9E9E9
| 52518 ||  || — || April 20, 1996 || La Silla || E. W. Elst || — || align=right | 3.0 km || 
|-id=519 bgcolor=#E9E9E9
| 52519 ||  || — || May 15, 1996 || Haleakala || NEAT || — || align=right | 3.1 km || 
|-id=520 bgcolor=#fefefe
| 52520 ||  || — || May 9, 1996 || Kitt Peak || Spacewatch || — || align=right | 6.0 km || 
|-id=521 bgcolor=#fefefe
| 52521 ||  || — || May 9, 1996 || Kitt Peak || Spacewatch || NYS || align=right | 4.8 km || 
|-id=522 bgcolor=#fefefe
| 52522 ||  || — || May 15, 1996 || Kitt Peak || Spacewatch || NYS || align=right | 1.9 km || 
|-id=523 bgcolor=#E9E9E9
| 52523 ||  || — || May 15, 1996 || Kitt Peak || Spacewatch || — || align=right | 5.4 km || 
|-id=524 bgcolor=#E9E9E9
| 52524 || 1996 PH || — || August 8, 1996 || Kleť || Kleť Obs. || — || align=right | 2.0 km || 
|-id=525 bgcolor=#fefefe
| 52525 || 1996 PJ || — || August 8, 1996 || Haleakala || AMOS || H || align=right | 1.7 km || 
|-id=526 bgcolor=#fefefe
| 52526 ||  || — || August 15, 1996 || Haleakala || NEAT || H || align=right | 1.8 km || 
|-id=527 bgcolor=#E9E9E9
| 52527 ||  || — || August 10, 1996 || Haleakala || NEAT || — || align=right | 5.5 km || 
|-id=528 bgcolor=#d6d6d6
| 52528 ||  || — || August 8, 1996 || La Silla || E. W. Elst || KOR || align=right | 4.0 km || 
|-id=529 bgcolor=#fefefe
| 52529 || 1996 RQ || — || September 7, 1996 || Catalina Station || T. B. Spahr || H || align=right | 2.1 km || 
|-id=530 bgcolor=#d6d6d6
| 52530 ||  || — || October 8, 1996 || Haleakala || NEAT || — || align=right | 6.8 km || 
|-id=531 bgcolor=#d6d6d6
| 52531 ||  || — || October 12, 1996 || Sudbury || D. di Cicco || — || align=right | 9.7 km || 
|-id=532 bgcolor=#d6d6d6
| 52532 ||  || — || October 9, 1996 || Haleakala || NEAT || — || align=right | 6.1 km || 
|-id=533 bgcolor=#fefefe
| 52533 ||  || — || October 9, 1996 || Kushiro || S. Ueda, H. Kaneda || H || align=right | 2.6 km || 
|-id=534 bgcolor=#fefefe
| 52534 ||  || — || October 7, 1996 || Haleakala || AMOS || H || align=right | 2.0 km || 
|-id=535 bgcolor=#d6d6d6
| 52535 ||  || — || October 5, 1996 || Kitt Peak || Spacewatch || EOS || align=right | 4.5 km || 
|-id=536 bgcolor=#d6d6d6
| 52536 ||  || — || October 5, 1996 || Kitt Peak || Spacewatch || — || align=right | 5.0 km || 
|-id=537 bgcolor=#d6d6d6
| 52537 ||  || — || October 9, 1996 || Kitt Peak || Spacewatch || — || align=right | 8.1 km || 
|-id=538 bgcolor=#fefefe
| 52538 ||  || — || October 8, 1996 || La Silla || E. W. Elst || NYS || align=right | 2.9 km || 
|-id=539 bgcolor=#d6d6d6
| 52539 ||  || — || October 8, 1996 || La Silla || E. W. Elst || EOS || align=right | 3.9 km || 
|-id=540 bgcolor=#d6d6d6
| 52540 ||  || — || October 9, 1996 || Kushiro || S. Ueda, H. Kaneda || EOS || align=right | 6.7 km || 
|-id=541 bgcolor=#d6d6d6
| 52541 || 1996 VB || — || November 1, 1996 || Prescott || P. G. Comba || KOR || align=right | 3.3 km || 
|-id=542 bgcolor=#d6d6d6
| 52542 ||  || — || November 13, 1996 || Oizumi || T. Kobayashi || — || align=right | 10 km || 
|-id=543 bgcolor=#d6d6d6
| 52543 ||  || — || November 4, 1996 || Kitt Peak || Spacewatch || VER || align=right | 7.8 km || 
|-id=544 bgcolor=#d6d6d6
| 52544 ||  || — || November 4, 1996 || Kitt Peak || Spacewatch || — || align=right | 11 km || 
|-id=545 bgcolor=#d6d6d6
| 52545 ||  || — || November 5, 1996 || Kitt Peak || Spacewatch || HYG || align=right | 6.4 km || 
|-id=546 bgcolor=#d6d6d6
| 52546 || 1996 XW || — || December 1, 1996 || Chichibu || N. Satō || EOS || align=right | 6.2 km || 
|-id=547 bgcolor=#d6d6d6
| 52547 ||  || — || December 2, 1996 || Oizumi || T. Kobayashi || ALA || align=right | 12 km || 
|-id=548 bgcolor=#d6d6d6
| 52548 ||  || — || December 3, 1996 || Prescott || P. G. Comba || HYG || align=right | 6.9 km || 
|-id=549 bgcolor=#d6d6d6
| 52549 ||  || — || December 14, 1996 || Oizumi || T. Kobayashi || VER || align=right | 8.1 km || 
|-id=550 bgcolor=#d6d6d6
| 52550 ||  || — || December 30, 1996 || Chichibu || N. Satō || — || align=right | 14 km || 
|-id=551 bgcolor=#d6d6d6
| 52551 || 1997 AL || — || January 2, 1997 || Oizumi || T. Kobayashi || VER || align=right | 8.0 km || 
|-id=552 bgcolor=#d6d6d6
| 52552 ||  || — || January 14, 1997 || Haleakala || NEAT || — || align=right | 8.1 km || 
|-id=553 bgcolor=#E9E9E9
| 52553 ||  || — || February 6, 1997 || Kitt Peak || Spacewatch || — || align=right | 3.6 km || 
|-id=554 bgcolor=#fefefe
| 52554 ||  || — || March 2, 1997 || Kitt Peak || Spacewatch || — || align=right | 1.9 km || 
|-id=555 bgcolor=#fefefe
| 52555 ||  || — || March 2, 1997 || Kitt Peak || Spacewatch || — || align=right | 1.8 km || 
|-id=556 bgcolor=#d6d6d6
| 52556 ||  || — || March 4, 1997 || Socorro || LINEAR || — || align=right | 8.5 km || 
|-id=557 bgcolor=#fefefe
| 52557 ||  || — || March 10, 1997 || Socorro || LINEAR || FLO || align=right | 1.7 km || 
|-id=558 bgcolor=#fefefe
| 52558 Pigafetta || 1997 FR ||  || March 27, 1997 || Colleverde || V. S. Casulli || — || align=right | 3.6 km || 
|-id=559 bgcolor=#fefefe
| 52559 ||  || — || March 31, 1997 || Socorro || LINEAR || — || align=right | 7.3 km || 
|-id=560 bgcolor=#fefefe
| 52560 ||  || — || April 3, 1997 || Socorro || LINEAR || — || align=right | 2.1 km || 
|-id=561 bgcolor=#fefefe
| 52561 ||  || — || April 3, 1997 || Socorro || LINEAR || — || align=right | 2.4 km || 
|-id=562 bgcolor=#fefefe
| 52562 ||  || — || April 3, 1997 || Socorro || LINEAR || — || align=right | 2.5 km || 
|-id=563 bgcolor=#fefefe
| 52563 ||  || — || April 3, 1997 || Socorro || LINEAR || — || align=right | 1.9 km || 
|-id=564 bgcolor=#fefefe
| 52564 ||  || — || April 6, 1997 || Socorro || LINEAR || — || align=right | 1.9 km || 
|-id=565 bgcolor=#fefefe
| 52565 ||  || — || April 6, 1997 || Socorro || LINEAR || NYS || align=right | 1.8 km || 
|-id=566 bgcolor=#fefefe
| 52566 ||  || — || April 2, 1997 || Xinglong || SCAP || — || align=right | 4.2 km || 
|-id=567 bgcolor=#C2FFFF
| 52567 ||  || — || April 28, 1997 || Prescott || P. G. Comba || L5 || align=right | 22 km || 
|-id=568 bgcolor=#fefefe
| 52568 ||  || — || April 30, 1997 || Socorro || LINEAR || NYS || align=right | 3.3 km || 
|-id=569 bgcolor=#fefefe
| 52569 ||  || — || April 30, 1997 || Socorro || LINEAR || — || align=right | 3.0 km || 
|-id=570 bgcolor=#fefefe
| 52570 Lauraco ||  ||  || May 1, 1997 || Bologna || San Vittore Obs. || — || align=right | 3.0 km || 
|-id=571 bgcolor=#fefefe
| 52571 ||  || — || May 29, 1997 || Kitt Peak || Spacewatch || FLO || align=right | 1.9 km || 
|-id=572 bgcolor=#fefefe
| 52572 || 1997 LL || — || June 3, 1997 || Xinglong || SCAP || — || align=right | 2.3 km || 
|-id=573 bgcolor=#fefefe
| 52573 ||  || — || June 7, 1997 || La Silla || E. W. Elst || V || align=right | 1.9 km || 
|-id=574 bgcolor=#E9E9E9
| 52574 ||  || — || June 28, 1997 || Socorro || LINEAR || EUN || align=right | 3.6 km || 
|-id=575 bgcolor=#E9E9E9
| 52575 ||  || — || June 26, 1997 || Kitt Peak || Spacewatch || — || align=right | 2.3 km || 
|-id=576 bgcolor=#fefefe
| 52576 ||  || — || June 28, 1997 || Kitt Peak || Spacewatch || CHL || align=right | 3.6 km || 
|-id=577 bgcolor=#E9E9E9
| 52577 ||  || — || June 27, 1997 || Kitt Peak || Spacewatch || ADE || align=right | 3.9 km || 
|-id=578 bgcolor=#fefefe
| 52578 || 1997 NE || — || July 1, 1997 || Kitt Peak || Spacewatch || NYS || align=right | 1.3 km || 
|-id=579 bgcolor=#E9E9E9
| 52579 || 1997 NH || — || July 1, 1997 || Kitt Peak || Spacewatch || — || align=right | 1.9 km || 
|-id=580 bgcolor=#fefefe
| 52580 || 1997 NO || — || July 1, 1997 || Kitt Peak || Spacewatch || V || align=right | 1.8 km || 
|-id=581 bgcolor=#fefefe
| 52581 ||  || — || July 3, 1997 || Farra d'Isonzo || Farra d'Isonzo || NYS || align=right | 2.4 km || 
|-id=582 bgcolor=#E9E9E9
| 52582 ||  || — || July 9, 1997 || Kitt Peak || Spacewatch || — || align=right | 2.4 km || 
|-id=583 bgcolor=#E9E9E9
| 52583 ||  || — || July 2, 1997 || Kitt Peak || Spacewatch || — || align=right | 3.1 km || 
|-id=584 bgcolor=#fefefe
| 52584 ||  || — || July 30, 1997 || Farra d'Isonzo || Farra d'Isonzo || — || align=right | 2.5 km || 
|-id=585 bgcolor=#E9E9E9
| 52585 ||  || — || July 29, 1997 || Bédoin || P. Antonini || — || align=right | 2.8 km || 
|-id=586 bgcolor=#fefefe
| 52586 || 1997 PB || — || August 1, 1997 || Haleakala || NEAT || — || align=right | 3.6 km || 
|-id=587 bgcolor=#fefefe
| 52587 || 1997 PD || — || August 1, 1997 || Haleakala || NEAT || — || align=right | 6.1 km || 
|-id=588 bgcolor=#fefefe
| 52588 ||  || — || August 3, 1997 || Xinglong || SCAP || — || align=right | 2.4 km || 
|-id=589 bgcolor=#fefefe
| 52589 Montviloff ||  ||  || August 12, 1997 || Pises || Pises Obs. || — || align=right | 2.0 km || 
|-id=590 bgcolor=#fefefe
| 52590 ||  || — || August 11, 1997 || Xinglong || SCAP || NYS || align=right | 2.1 km || 
|-id=591 bgcolor=#E9E9E9
| 52591 || 1997 QD || — || August 22, 1997 || Kleť || Z. Moravec || — || align=right | 2.9 km || 
|-id=592 bgcolor=#E9E9E9
| 52592 ||  || — || August 27, 1997 || Nachi-Katsuura || Y. Shimizu, T. Urata || — || align=right | 6.5 km || 
|-id=593 bgcolor=#d6d6d6
| 52593 ||  || — || August 27, 1997 || Nachi-Katsuura || Y. Shimizu, T. Urata || — || align=right | 5.7 km || 
|-id=594 bgcolor=#fefefe
| 52594 ||  || — || September 5, 1997 || Rand || G. R. Viscome || — || align=right | 2.3 km || 
|-id=595 bgcolor=#E9E9E9
| 52595 ||  || — || September 1, 1997 || Caussols || ODAS || — || align=right | 3.5 km || 
|-id=596 bgcolor=#E9E9E9
| 52596 ||  || — || September 4, 1997 || Xinglong || SCAP || — || align=right | 1.9 km || 
|-id=597 bgcolor=#E9E9E9
| 52597 ||  || — || September 15, 1997 || Ondřejov || L. Kotková || — || align=right | 3.5 km || 
|-id=598 bgcolor=#E9E9E9
| 52598 ||  || — || September 25, 1997 || Rand || G. R. Viscome || MIS || align=right | 4.8 km || 
|-id=599 bgcolor=#E9E9E9
| 52599 ||  || — || September 27, 1997 || Oizumi || T. Kobayashi || — || align=right | 3.4 km || 
|-id=600 bgcolor=#fefefe
| 52600 ||  || — || September 26, 1997 || Xinglong || SCAP || — || align=right | 3.3 km || 
|}

52601–52700 

|-bgcolor=#E9E9E9
| 52601 Iwayaji ||  ||  || September 29, 1997 || Kuma Kogen || A. Nakamura || — || align=right | 2.5 km || 
|-id=602 bgcolor=#d6d6d6
| 52602 ||  || — || October 2, 1997 || Caussols || ODAS || KOR || align=right | 4.7 km || 
|-id=603 bgcolor=#E9E9E9
| 52603 ||  || — || October 5, 1997 || Ondřejov || L. Kotková || — || align=right | 4.2 km || 
|-id=604 bgcolor=#E9E9E9
| 52604 Thomayer ||  ||  || October 5, 1997 || Ondřejov || P. Pravec || — || align=right | 4.2 km || 
|-id=605 bgcolor=#E9E9E9
| 52605 ||  || — || October 3, 1997 || Kitt Peak || Spacewatch || EUN || align=right | 3.2 km || 
|-id=606 bgcolor=#fefefe
| 52606 ||  || — || October 3, 1997 || Kitt Peak || Spacewatch || MAS || align=right | 1.8 km || 
|-id=607 bgcolor=#E9E9E9
| 52607 ||  || — || October 7, 1997 || Rand || G. R. Viscome || — || align=right | 3.4 km || 
|-id=608 bgcolor=#E9E9E9
| 52608 ||  || — || October 10, 1997 || Ondřejov || L. Kotková || EUN || align=right | 2.1 km || 
|-id=609 bgcolor=#E9E9E9
| 52609 ||  || — || October 5, 1997 || Xinglong || SCAP || — || align=right | 3.0 km || 
|-id=610 bgcolor=#E9E9E9
| 52610 ||  || — || October 23, 1997 || Prescott || P. G. Comba || — || align=right | 3.9 km || 
|-id=611 bgcolor=#E9E9E9
| 52611 ||  || — || October 26, 1997 || Oizumi || T. Kobayashi || EUN || align=right | 3.9 km || 
|-id=612 bgcolor=#E9E9E9
| 52612 ||  || — || October 27, 1997 || Prescott || P. G. Comba || — || align=right | 3.8 km || 
|-id=613 bgcolor=#E9E9E9
| 52613 ||  || — || October 29, 1997 || Haleakala || NEAT || — || align=right | 5.3 km || 
|-id=614 bgcolor=#E9E9E9
| 52614 ||  || — || October 29, 1997 || Woomera || F. B. Zoltowski || — || align=right | 2.8 km || 
|-id=615 bgcolor=#d6d6d6
| 52615 ||  || — || October 23, 1997 || Kitt Peak || Spacewatch || KOR || align=right | 2.3 km || 
|-id=616 bgcolor=#E9E9E9
| 52616 ||  || — || October 25, 1997 || Kitt Peak || Spacewatch || — || align=right | 3.3 km || 
|-id=617 bgcolor=#E9E9E9
| 52617 ||  || — || November 1, 1997 || Oohira || T. Urata || — || align=right | 3.8 km || 
|-id=618 bgcolor=#E9E9E9
| 52618 ||  || — || November 4, 1997 || Woomera || F. B. Zoltowski || — || align=right | 6.0 km || 
|-id=619 bgcolor=#E9E9E9
| 52619 ||  || — || November 1, 1997 || Xinglong || SCAP || — || align=right | 3.0 km || 
|-id=620 bgcolor=#E9E9E9
| 52620 ||  || — || November 6, 1997 || Oizumi || T. Kobayashi || — || align=right | 3.8 km || 
|-id=621 bgcolor=#E9E9E9
| 52621 ||  || — || November 4, 1997 || Nachi-Katsuura || Y. Shimizu, T. Urata || EUN || align=right | 5.5 km || 
|-id=622 bgcolor=#E9E9E9
| 52622 ||  || — || November 8, 1997 || Oizumi || T. Kobayashi || — || align=right | 5.1 km || 
|-id=623 bgcolor=#E9E9E9
| 52623 ||  || — || November 6, 1997 || Chichibu || N. Satō || — || align=right | 4.7 km || 
|-id=624 bgcolor=#E9E9E9
| 52624 ||  || — || November 2, 1997 || Črni Vrh || H. Mikuž || — || align=right | 6.1 km || 
|-id=625 bgcolor=#E9E9E9
| 52625 || 1997 WD || — || November 18, 1997 || Oizumi || T. Kobayashi || — || align=right | 5.0 km || 
|-id=626 bgcolor=#E9E9E9
| 52626 ||  || — || November 19, 1997 || Xinglong || SCAP || — || align=right | 6.6 km || 
|-id=627 bgcolor=#d6d6d6
| 52627 ||  || — || November 23, 1997 || Oizumi || T. Kobayashi || ALA || align=right | 13 km || 
|-id=628 bgcolor=#E9E9E9
| 52628 ||  || — || November 16, 1997 || Xinglong || SCAP || — || align=right | 5.2 km || 
|-id=629 bgcolor=#E9E9E9
| 52629 ||  || — || November 23, 1997 || Chichibu || N. Satō || — || align=right | 5.6 km || 
|-id=630 bgcolor=#E9E9E9
| 52630 ||  || — || November 20, 1997 || Kitt Peak || Spacewatch || — || align=right | 3.9 km || 
|-id=631 bgcolor=#E9E9E9
| 52631 ||  || — || November 20, 1997 || Dynic || A. Sugie || — || align=right | 3.4 km || 
|-id=632 bgcolor=#E9E9E9
| 52632 ||  || — || November 30, 1997 || Oizumi || T. Kobayashi || — || align=right | 9.9 km || 
|-id=633 bgcolor=#E9E9E9
| 52633 Turvey ||  ||  || November 30, 1997 || Stakenbridge Obs. || B. G. W. Manning || — || align=right | 4.9 km || 
|-id=634 bgcolor=#E9E9E9
| 52634 ||  || — || November 24, 1997 || Kushiro || S. Ueda, H. Kaneda || — || align=right | 8.4 km || 
|-id=635 bgcolor=#E9E9E9
| 52635 ||  || — || November 29, 1997 || Socorro || LINEAR || — || align=right | 7.0 km || 
|-id=636 bgcolor=#E9E9E9
| 52636 ||  || — || November 29, 1997 || Socorro || LINEAR || HNS || align=right | 3.3 km || 
|-id=637 bgcolor=#E9E9E9
| 52637 ||  || — || November 29, 1997 || Socorro || LINEAR || HOF || align=right | 6.3 km || 
|-id=638 bgcolor=#d6d6d6
| 52638 ||  || — || November 29, 1997 || Socorro || LINEAR || KOR || align=right | 4.8 km || 
|-id=639 bgcolor=#E9E9E9
| 52639 ||  || — || November 29, 1997 || Socorro || LINEAR || GEF || align=right | 4.2 km || 
|-id=640 bgcolor=#fefefe
| 52640 ||  || — || November 26, 1997 || Socorro || LINEAR || — || align=right | 3.1 km || 
|-id=641 bgcolor=#E9E9E9
| 52641 ||  || — || November 29, 1997 || Socorro || LINEAR || HEN || align=right | 2.6 km || 
|-id=642 bgcolor=#E9E9E9
| 52642 ||  || — || November 29, 1997 || Socorro || LINEAR || — || align=right | 3.8 km || 
|-id=643 bgcolor=#E9E9E9
| 52643 || 1997 XK || — || December 3, 1997 || Oizumi || T. Kobayashi || — || align=right | 3.5 km || 
|-id=644 bgcolor=#E9E9E9
| 52644 ||  || — || December 8, 1997 || Xinglong || SCAP || MIS || align=right | 5.1 km || 
|-id=645 bgcolor=#C2FFFF
| 52645 ||  || — || December 2, 1997 || La Silla || UDTS || L4 || align=right | 13 km || 
|-id=646 bgcolor=#E9E9E9
| 52646 || 1997 YC || — || December 18, 1997 || Oizumi || T. Kobayashi || — || align=right | 6.4 km || 
|-id=647 bgcolor=#d6d6d6
| 52647 ||  || — || December 23, 1997 || Xinglong || SCAP || KOR || align=right | 4.5 km || 
|-id=648 bgcolor=#d6d6d6
| 52648 ||  || — || December 25, 1997 || Oizumi || T. Kobayashi || — || align=right | 5.7 km || 
|-id=649 bgcolor=#d6d6d6
| 52649 Chrismith ||  ||  || December 27, 1997 || Goodricke-Pigott || R. A. Tucker || EOS || align=right | 6.0 km || 
|-id=650 bgcolor=#d6d6d6
| 52650 ||  || — || December 28, 1997 || Kitt Peak || Spacewatch || — || align=right | 5.0 km || 
|-id=651 bgcolor=#d6d6d6
| 52651 ||  || — || December 27, 1997 || Xinglong || SCAP || — || align=right | 13 km || 
|-id=652 bgcolor=#E9E9E9
| 52652 ||  || — || December 31, 1997 || Kitt Peak || Spacewatch || — || align=right | 11 km || 
|-id=653 bgcolor=#d6d6d6
| 52653 ||  || — || January 3, 1998 || Xinglong || SCAP || — || align=right | 7.8 km || 
|-id=654 bgcolor=#d6d6d6
| 52654 ||  || — || January 8, 1998 || Caussols || ODAS || EOS || align=right | 6.7 km || 
|-id=655 bgcolor=#fefefe
| 52655 ||  || — || January 8, 1998 || Caussols || ODAS || — || align=right | 3.0 km || 
|-id=656 bgcolor=#d6d6d6
| 52656 ||  || — || January 4, 1998 || Xinglong || SCAP || VER || align=right | 7.0 km || 
|-id=657 bgcolor=#d6d6d6
| 52657 ||  || — || January 5, 1998 || Oizumi || T. Kobayashi || ALA || align=right | 14 km || 
|-id=658 bgcolor=#E9E9E9
| 52658 ||  || — || January 22, 1998 || Kitt Peak || Spacewatch || — || align=right | 8.6 km || 
|-id=659 bgcolor=#E9E9E9
| 52659 ||  || — || January 19, 1998 || Uenohara || N. Kawasato || — || align=right | 3.7 km || 
|-id=660 bgcolor=#d6d6d6
| 52660 ||  || — || January 25, 1998 || Oizumi || T. Kobayashi || — || align=right | 7.7 km || 
|-id=661 bgcolor=#d6d6d6
| 52661 ||  || — || January 25, 1998 || Oizumi || T. Kobayashi || ALA || align=right | 12 km || 
|-id=662 bgcolor=#E9E9E9
| 52662 ||  || — || January 23, 1998 || Socorro || LINEAR || — || align=right | 7.1 km || 
|-id=663 bgcolor=#d6d6d6
| 52663 ||  || — || January 23, 1998 || Kitt Peak || Spacewatch || — || align=right | 4.9 km || 
|-id=664 bgcolor=#d6d6d6
| 52664 ||  || — || January 22, 1998 || Kitt Peak || Spacewatch || KOR || align=right | 3.3 km || 
|-id=665 bgcolor=#d6d6d6
| 52665 Brianmay ||  ||  || January 30, 1998 || Kleť || J. Tichá, M. Tichý || — || align=right | 4.5 km || 
|-id=666 bgcolor=#d6d6d6
| 52666 ||  || — || January 31, 1998 || Oizumi || T. Kobayashi || — || align=right | 12 km || 
|-id=667 bgcolor=#d6d6d6
| 52667 ||  || — || February 1, 1998 || Burlington || T. Handley || — || align=right | 5.9 km || 
|-id=668 bgcolor=#d6d6d6
| 52668 ||  || — || February 6, 1998 || La Silla || E. W. Elst || — || align=right | 12 km || 
|-id=669 bgcolor=#d6d6d6
| 52669 ||  || — || February 20, 1998 || Caussols || ODAS || MEL || align=right | 9.7 km || 
|-id=670 bgcolor=#d6d6d6
| 52670 Alby ||  ||  || February 20, 1998 || Bologna || San Vittore Obs. || — || align=right | 4.1 km || 
|-id=671 bgcolor=#d6d6d6
| 52671 ||  || — || February 22, 1998 || Haleakala || NEAT || — || align=right | 8.3 km || 
|-id=672 bgcolor=#d6d6d6
| 52672 ||  || — || February 22, 1998 || Haleakala || NEAT || — || align=right | 9.5 km || 
|-id=673 bgcolor=#d6d6d6
| 52673 ||  || — || February 22, 1998 || Haleakala || NEAT || — || align=right | 9.2 km || 
|-id=674 bgcolor=#d6d6d6
| 52674 ||  || — || February 23, 1998 || Kitt Peak || Spacewatch || HYG || align=right | 7.3 km || 
|-id=675 bgcolor=#d6d6d6
| 52675 ||  || — || February 22, 1998 || Haleakala || NEAT || — || align=right | 11 km || 
|-id=676 bgcolor=#d6d6d6
| 52676 ||  || — || February 26, 1998 || Haleakala || NEAT || URS || align=right | 10 km || 
|-id=677 bgcolor=#d6d6d6
| 52677 ||  || — || February 22, 1998 || Kitt Peak || Spacewatch || — || align=right | 14 km || 
|-id=678 bgcolor=#d6d6d6
| 52678 ||  || — || February 22, 1998 || Kitt Peak || Spacewatch || EOS || align=right | 6.3 km || 
|-id=679 bgcolor=#d6d6d6
| 52679 ||  || — || February 24, 1998 || Kitt Peak || Spacewatch || EOS || align=right | 4.8 km || 
|-id=680 bgcolor=#d6d6d6
| 52680 ||  || — || February 21, 1998 || Kitt Peak || Spacewatch || THM || align=right | 7.2 km || 
|-id=681 bgcolor=#d6d6d6
| 52681 Kelleghan ||  ||  || February 27, 1998 || La Silla || E. W. Elst || — || align=right | 7.5 km || 
|-id=682 bgcolor=#d6d6d6
| 52682 ||  || — || February 27, 1998 || La Silla || E. W. Elst || VER || align=right | 6.5 km || 
|-id=683 bgcolor=#fefefe
| 52683 ||  || — || February 27, 1998 || La Silla || E. W. Elst || — || align=right | 2.2 km || 
|-id=684 bgcolor=#E9E9E9
| 52684 ||  || — || March 2, 1998 || Xinglong || SCAP || AGN || align=right | 4.4 km || 
|-id=685 bgcolor=#d6d6d6
| 52685 ||  || — || March 11, 1998 || Xinglong || SCAP || LIX || align=right | 8.7 km || 
|-id=686 bgcolor=#d6d6d6
| 52686 ||  || — || March 1, 1998 || La Silla || E. W. Elst || EUP || align=right | 9.2 km || 
|-id=687 bgcolor=#d6d6d6
| 52687 ||  || — || March 1, 1998 || La Silla || E. W. Elst || — || align=right | 8.0 km || 
|-id=688 bgcolor=#d6d6d6
| 52688 ||  || — || March 21, 1998 || Lime Creek || R. Linderholm || EOS || align=right | 6.0 km || 
|-id=689 bgcolor=#FFC2E0
| 52689 ||  || — || March 20, 1998 || Socorro || LINEAR || AMO || align=right data-sort-value="0.62" | 620 m || 
|-id=690 bgcolor=#fefefe
| 52690 ||  || — || March 20, 1998 || Socorro || LINEAR || H || align=right | 1.8 km || 
|-id=691 bgcolor=#d6d6d6
| 52691 ||  || — || March 18, 1998 || Kitt Peak || Spacewatch || THM || align=right | 4.7 km || 
|-id=692 bgcolor=#d6d6d6
| 52692 ||  || — || March 21, 1998 || Kitt Peak || Spacewatch || — || align=right | 11 km || 
|-id=693 bgcolor=#d6d6d6
| 52693 ||  || — || March 26, 1998 || Haleakala || NEAT || HYG || align=right | 7.8 km || 
|-id=694 bgcolor=#d6d6d6
| 52694 ||  || — || March 20, 1998 || Socorro || LINEAR || — || align=right | 4.2 km || 
|-id=695 bgcolor=#d6d6d6
| 52695 ||  || — || March 20, 1998 || Socorro || LINEAR || URS || align=right | 9.6 km || 
|-id=696 bgcolor=#d6d6d6
| 52696 ||  || — || March 20, 1998 || Socorro || LINEAR || THM || align=right | 5.0 km || 
|-id=697 bgcolor=#d6d6d6
| 52697 ||  || — || March 20, 1998 || Socorro || LINEAR || — || align=right | 7.8 km || 
|-id=698 bgcolor=#d6d6d6
| 52698 ||  || — || March 20, 1998 || Socorro || LINEAR || — || align=right | 5.9 km || 
|-id=699 bgcolor=#d6d6d6
| 52699 ||  || — || March 20, 1998 || Socorro || LINEAR || — || align=right | 6.5 km || 
|-id=700 bgcolor=#d6d6d6
| 52700 ||  || — || March 20, 1998 || Socorro || LINEAR || 7:4 || align=right | 7.0 km || 
|}

52701–52800 

|-bgcolor=#d6d6d6
| 52701 ||  || — || March 20, 1998 || Socorro || LINEAR || THM || align=right | 7.0 km || 
|-id=702 bgcolor=#d6d6d6
| 52702 ||  || — || March 20, 1998 || Socorro || LINEAR || 3:2 || align=right | 11 km || 
|-id=703 bgcolor=#d6d6d6
| 52703 ||  || — || March 26, 1998 || Caussols || ODAS || THM || align=right | 6.3 km || 
|-id=704 bgcolor=#d6d6d6
| 52704 ||  || — || March 24, 1998 || Socorro || LINEAR || — || align=right | 14 km || 
|-id=705 bgcolor=#d6d6d6
| 52705 ||  || — || March 24, 1998 || Socorro || LINEAR || — || align=right | 11 km || 
|-id=706 bgcolor=#d6d6d6
| 52706 ||  || — || March 24, 1998 || Socorro || LINEAR || 7:4 || align=right | 14 km || 
|-id=707 bgcolor=#d6d6d6
| 52707 ||  || — || March 24, 1998 || Socorro || LINEAR || HYG || align=right | 8.8 km || 
|-id=708 bgcolor=#d6d6d6
| 52708 ||  || — || March 24, 1998 || Socorro || LINEAR || HYG || align=right | 6.1 km || 
|-id=709 bgcolor=#d6d6d6
| 52709 ||  || — || March 24, 1998 || Socorro || LINEAR || — || align=right | 4.8 km || 
|-id=710 bgcolor=#fefefe
| 52710 ||  || — || March 24, 1998 || Socorro || LINEAR || — || align=right | 3.3 km || 
|-id=711 bgcolor=#d6d6d6
| 52711 ||  || — || March 31, 1998 || Socorro || LINEAR || EOS || align=right | 7.2 km || 
|-id=712 bgcolor=#d6d6d6
| 52712 ||  || — || March 31, 1998 || Socorro || LINEAR || — || align=right | 6.6 km || 
|-id=713 bgcolor=#d6d6d6
| 52713 ||  || — || March 31, 1998 || Socorro || LINEAR || — || align=right | 6.9 km || 
|-id=714 bgcolor=#d6d6d6
| 52714 ||  || — || March 31, 1998 || Socorro || LINEAR || — || align=right | 6.7 km || 
|-id=715 bgcolor=#d6d6d6
| 52715 ||  || — || March 31, 1998 || Socorro || LINEAR || HYG || align=right | 6.4 km || 
|-id=716 bgcolor=#d6d6d6
| 52716 ||  || — || March 20, 1998 || Socorro || LINEAR || THM || align=right | 4.5 km || 
|-id=717 bgcolor=#d6d6d6
| 52717 ||  || — || March 20, 1998 || Socorro || LINEAR || THM || align=right | 6.4 km || 
|-id=718 bgcolor=#d6d6d6
| 52718 ||  || — || March 27, 1998 || Reedy Creek || J. Broughton || — || align=right | 6.2 km || 
|-id=719 bgcolor=#d6d6d6
| 52719 ||  || — || March 22, 1998 || Socorro || LINEAR || HYG || align=right | 6.1 km || 
|-id=720 bgcolor=#d6d6d6
| 52720 ||  || — || March 26, 1998 || Haleakala || NEAT || — || align=right | 8.5 km || 
|-id=721 bgcolor=#d6d6d6
| 52721 ||  || — || March 29, 1998 || Socorro || LINEAR || THM || align=right | 4.9 km || 
|-id=722 bgcolor=#FA8072
| 52722 || 1998 GK || — || April 2, 1998 || Socorro || LINEAR || H || align=right | 3.4 km || 
|-id=723 bgcolor=#d6d6d6
| 52723 ||  || — || April 2, 1998 || Socorro || LINEAR || — || align=right | 13 km || 
|-id=724 bgcolor=#d6d6d6
| 52724 ||  || — || April 2, 1998 || Socorro || LINEAR || — || align=right | 8.5 km || 
|-id=725 bgcolor=#d6d6d6
| 52725 ||  || — || April 2, 1998 || Socorro || LINEAR || MEL || align=right | 9.8 km || 
|-id=726 bgcolor=#d6d6d6
| 52726 ||  || — || April 2, 1998 || Socorro || LINEAR || FIR || align=right | 11 km || 
|-id=727 bgcolor=#d6d6d6
| 52727 ||  || — || April 2, 1998 || Socorro || LINEAR || — || align=right | 6.0 km || 
|-id=728 bgcolor=#d6d6d6
| 52728 ||  || — || April 2, 1998 || Socorro || LINEAR || MEL || align=right | 7.2 km || 
|-id=729 bgcolor=#d6d6d6
| 52729 ||  || — || April 2, 1998 || Socorro || LINEAR || — || align=right | 8.6 km || 
|-id=730 bgcolor=#FA8072
| 52730 ||  || — || April 22, 1998 || Kitt Peak || Spacewatch || — || align=right | 1.7 km || 
|-id=731 bgcolor=#d6d6d6
| 52731 ||  || — || April 23, 1998 || Haleakala || NEAT || — || align=right | 8.2 km || 
|-id=732 bgcolor=#d6d6d6
| 52732 ||  || — || April 22, 1998 || Kitt Peak || Spacewatch || — || align=right | 8.1 km || 
|-id=733 bgcolor=#d6d6d6
| 52733 ||  || — || April 20, 1998 || Socorro || LINEAR || — || align=right | 6.2 km || 
|-id=734 bgcolor=#d6d6d6
| 52734 ||  || — || April 20, 1998 || Socorro || LINEAR || EUP || align=right | 7.6 km || 
|-id=735 bgcolor=#d6d6d6
| 52735 ||  || — || April 20, 1998 || Socorro || LINEAR || HYG || align=right | 6.5 km || 
|-id=736 bgcolor=#d6d6d6
| 52736 ||  || — || April 21, 1998 || Socorro || LINEAR || — || align=right | 7.6 km || 
|-id=737 bgcolor=#d6d6d6
| 52737 ||  || — || April 21, 1998 || Socorro || LINEAR || — || align=right | 6.7 km || 
|-id=738 bgcolor=#d6d6d6
| 52738 ||  || — || April 23, 1998 || Socorro || LINEAR || — || align=right | 8.0 km || 
|-id=739 bgcolor=#d6d6d6
| 52739 ||  || — || April 23, 1998 || Socorro || LINEAR || — || align=right | 9.6 km || 
|-id=740 bgcolor=#d6d6d6
| 52740 ||  || — || April 23, 1998 || Socorro || LINEAR || — || align=right | 8.0 km || 
|-id=741 bgcolor=#d6d6d6
| 52741 ||  || — || April 23, 1998 || Socorro || LINEAR || — || align=right | 8.0 km || 
|-id=742 bgcolor=#d6d6d6
| 52742 ||  || — || April 18, 1998 || Socorro || LINEAR || — || align=right | 6.5 km || 
|-id=743 bgcolor=#d6d6d6
| 52743 ||  || — || April 20, 1998 || Socorro || LINEAR || EOS || align=right | 9.6 km || 
|-id=744 bgcolor=#d6d6d6
| 52744 ||  || — || April 20, 1998 || Socorro || LINEAR || — || align=right | 10 km || 
|-id=745 bgcolor=#d6d6d6
| 52745 ||  || — || April 20, 1998 || Socorro || LINEAR || — || align=right | 8.6 km || 
|-id=746 bgcolor=#fefefe
| 52746 ||  || — || April 25, 1998 || La Silla || E. W. Elst || — || align=right | 2.1 km || 
|-id=747 bgcolor=#C2E0FF
| 52747 ||  || — || April 29, 1998 || Mauna Kea || Mauna Kea Obs. || cubewano (cold)critical || align=right | 117 km || 
|-id=748 bgcolor=#fefefe
| 52748 ||  || — || May 1, 1998 || Haleakala || NEAT || H || align=right | 2.0 km || 
|-id=749 bgcolor=#d6d6d6
| 52749 ||  || — || May 23, 1998 || Anderson Mesa || LONEOS || ALA || align=right | 11 km || 
|-id=750 bgcolor=#FFC2E0
| 52750 ||  || — || May 29, 1998 || Socorro || LINEAR || APO +1km || align=right | 1.1 km || 
|-id=751 bgcolor=#d6d6d6
| 52751 ||  || — || May 22, 1998 || Socorro || LINEAR || ALA || align=right | 12 km || 
|-id=752 bgcolor=#fefefe
| 52752 ||  || — || May 22, 1998 || Socorro || LINEAR || — || align=right | 1.8 km || 
|-id=753 bgcolor=#fefefe
| 52753 ||  || — || May 27, 1998 || Socorro || LINEAR || H || align=right | 1.8 km || 
|-id=754 bgcolor=#d6d6d6
| 52754 ||  || — || May 22, 1998 || Socorro || LINEAR || — || align=right | 12 km || 
|-id=755 bgcolor=#d6d6d6
| 52755 || 1998 MU || — || June 16, 1998 || Socorro || LINEAR || — || align=right | 9.0 km || 
|-id=756 bgcolor=#fefefe
| 52756 ||  || — || June 18, 1998 || Kitt Peak || Spacewatch || — || align=right | 1.6 km || 
|-id=757 bgcolor=#fefefe
| 52757 ||  || — || June 23, 1998 || Anderson Mesa || LONEOS || PHO || align=right | 2.9 km || 
|-id=758 bgcolor=#fefefe
| 52758 ||  || — || June 19, 1998 || Socorro || LINEAR || — || align=right | 1.9 km || 
|-id=759 bgcolor=#fefefe
| 52759 ||  || — || June 25, 1998 || Woomera || F. B. Zoltowski || — || align=right | 4.5 km || 
|-id=760 bgcolor=#FFC2E0
| 52760 ||  || — || June 24, 1998 || Socorro || LINEAR || APO +1kmPHA || align=right | 1.0 km || 
|-id=761 bgcolor=#FFC2E0
| 52761 ||  || — || June 25, 1998 || Socorro || LINEAR || AMO +1km || align=right data-sort-value="0.96" | 960 m || 
|-id=762 bgcolor=#FFC2E0
| 52762 ||  || — || June 29, 1998 || Socorro || LINEAR || APO +1km || align=right | 6.7 km || 
|-id=763 bgcolor=#fefefe
| 52763 ||  || — || June 24, 1998 || Socorro || LINEAR || — || align=right | 1.9 km || 
|-id=764 bgcolor=#fefefe
| 52764 ||  || — || June 24, 1998 || Socorro || LINEAR || FLO || align=right | 2.0 km || 
|-id=765 bgcolor=#fefefe
| 52765 ||  || — || June 24, 1998 || Socorro || LINEAR || — || align=right | 3.8 km || 
|-id=766 bgcolor=#fefefe
| 52766 ||  || — || June 18, 1998 || Anderson Mesa || LONEOS || — || align=right | 2.4 km || 
|-id=767 bgcolor=#C2FFFF
| 52767 Ophelestes ||  ||  || June 28, 1998 || La Silla || E. W. Elst || L5 || align=right | 25 km || 
|-id=768 bgcolor=#FFC2E0
| 52768 ||  || — || July 24, 1998 || Haleakala || NEAT || APO +1kmPHA || align=right | 2.2 km || 
|-id=769 bgcolor=#fefefe
| 52769 ||  || — || July 26, 1998 || Prescott || P. G. Comba || FLO || align=right | 1.4 km || 
|-id=770 bgcolor=#fefefe
| 52770 ||  || — || July 26, 1998 || La Silla || E. W. Elst || FLO || align=right | 1.6 km || 
|-id=771 bgcolor=#fefefe
| 52771 || 1998 PX || — || August 14, 1998 || Woomera || F. B. Zoltowski || FLO || align=right | 1.6 km || 
|-id=772 bgcolor=#fefefe
| 52772 ||  || — || August 14, 1998 || Anderson Mesa || LONEOS || — || align=right | 1.9 km || 
|-id=773 bgcolor=#fefefe
| 52773 ||  || — || August 17, 1998 || Socorro || LINEAR || — || align=right | 2.2 km || 
|-id=774 bgcolor=#E9E9E9
| 52774 ||  || — || August 17, 1998 || Socorro || LINEAR || — || align=right | 1.9 km || 
|-id=775 bgcolor=#fefefe
| 52775 ||  || — || August 17, 1998 || Socorro || LINEAR || — || align=right | 2.0 km || 
|-id=776 bgcolor=#fefefe
| 52776 ||  || — || August 17, 1998 || Socorro || LINEAR || — || align=right | 1.6 km || 
|-id=777 bgcolor=#fefefe
| 52777 ||  || — || August 17, 1998 || Socorro || LINEAR || FLO || align=right | 1.9 km || 
|-id=778 bgcolor=#fefefe
| 52778 ||  || — || August 17, 1998 || Socorro || LINEAR || FLO || align=right | 2.2 km || 
|-id=779 bgcolor=#fefefe
| 52779 ||  || — || August 26, 1998 || Xinglong || SCAP || V || align=right | 1.6 km || 
|-id=780 bgcolor=#fefefe
| 52780 ||  || — || August 17, 1998 || Socorro || LINEAR || V || align=right | 2.3 km || 
|-id=781 bgcolor=#fefefe
| 52781 ||  || — || August 17, 1998 || Socorro || LINEAR || FLO || align=right | 2.6 km || 
|-id=782 bgcolor=#fefefe
| 52782 ||  || — || August 17, 1998 || Socorro || LINEAR || NYS || align=right | 1.4 km || 
|-id=783 bgcolor=#E9E9E9
| 52783 ||  || — || August 17, 1998 || Socorro || LINEAR || EUN || align=right | 3.0 km || 
|-id=784 bgcolor=#fefefe
| 52784 ||  || — || August 17, 1998 || Socorro || LINEAR || — || align=right | 2.2 km || 
|-id=785 bgcolor=#fefefe
| 52785 ||  || — || August 17, 1998 || Socorro || LINEAR || NYS || align=right | 1.3 km || 
|-id=786 bgcolor=#fefefe
| 52786 ||  || — || August 17, 1998 || Socorro || LINEAR || slow || align=right | 1.9 km || 
|-id=787 bgcolor=#fefefe
| 52787 ||  || — || August 17, 1998 || Socorro || LINEAR || — || align=right | 1.8 km || 
|-id=788 bgcolor=#fefefe
| 52788 ||  || — || August 17, 1998 || Socorro || LINEAR || — || align=right | 2.2 km || 
|-id=789 bgcolor=#fefefe
| 52789 ||  || — || August 17, 1998 || Socorro || LINEAR || V || align=right | 1.5 km || 
|-id=790 bgcolor=#fefefe
| 52790 ||  || — || August 17, 1998 || Socorro || LINEAR || — || align=right | 3.4 km || 
|-id=791 bgcolor=#fefefe
| 52791 ||  || — || August 17, 1998 || Socorro || LINEAR || FLO || align=right | 1.5 km || 
|-id=792 bgcolor=#fefefe
| 52792 ||  || — || August 17, 1998 || Socorro || LINEAR || V || align=right | 1.6 km || 
|-id=793 bgcolor=#fefefe
| 52793 ||  || — || August 17, 1998 || Socorro || LINEAR || — || align=right | 2.6 km || 
|-id=794 bgcolor=#fefefe
| 52794 ||  || — || August 17, 1998 || Socorro || LINEAR || — || align=right | 2.1 km || 
|-id=795 bgcolor=#fefefe
| 52795 ||  || — || August 17, 1998 || Socorro || LINEAR || FLO || align=right | 3.0 km || 
|-id=796 bgcolor=#fefefe
| 52796 ||  || — || August 17, 1998 || Socorro || LINEAR || — || align=right | 2.0 km || 
|-id=797 bgcolor=#fefefe
| 52797 ||  || — || August 27, 1998 || Anderson Mesa || LONEOS || — || align=right | 2.1 km || 
|-id=798 bgcolor=#fefefe
| 52798 ||  || — || August 26, 1998 || Caussols || ODAS || NYS || align=right | 3.4 km || 
|-id=799 bgcolor=#fefefe
| 52799 ||  || — || August 28, 1998 || Socorro || LINEAR || — || align=right | 2.7 km || 
|-id=800 bgcolor=#FA8072
| 52800 ||  || — || August 29, 1998 || Socorro || LINEAR || — || align=right | 6.0 km || 
|}

52801–52900 

|-bgcolor=#fefefe
| 52801 ||  || — || August 24, 1998 || Reedy Creek || J. Broughton || — || align=right | 2.0 km || 
|-id=802 bgcolor=#E9E9E9
| 52802 ||  || — || August 24, 1998 || Socorro || LINEAR || — || align=right | 2.3 km || 
|-id=803 bgcolor=#fefefe
| 52803 ||  || — || August 24, 1998 || Socorro || LINEAR || — || align=right | 2.3 km || 
|-id=804 bgcolor=#fefefe
| 52804 ||  || — || August 24, 1998 || Socorro || LINEAR || V || align=right | 1.6 km || 
|-id=805 bgcolor=#fefefe
| 52805 ||  || — || August 24, 1998 || Socorro || LINEAR || FLO || align=right | 3.2 km || 
|-id=806 bgcolor=#fefefe
| 52806 ||  || — || August 24, 1998 || Socorro || LINEAR || — || align=right | 3.2 km || 
|-id=807 bgcolor=#fefefe
| 52807 ||  || — || August 24, 1998 || Socorro || LINEAR || — || align=right | 2.0 km || 
|-id=808 bgcolor=#E9E9E9
| 52808 ||  || — || August 24, 1998 || Socorro || LINEAR || — || align=right | 2.9 km || 
|-id=809 bgcolor=#fefefe
| 52809 ||  || — || August 28, 1998 || Socorro || LINEAR || — || align=right | 3.6 km || 
|-id=810 bgcolor=#fefefe
| 52810 ||  || — || August 28, 1998 || Socorro || LINEAR || — || align=right | 3.2 km || 
|-id=811 bgcolor=#fefefe
| 52811 ||  || — || August 28, 1998 || Socorro || LINEAR || — || align=right | 2.4 km || 
|-id=812 bgcolor=#fefefe
| 52812 ||  || — || August 28, 1998 || Socorro || LINEAR || — || align=right | 4.5 km || 
|-id=813 bgcolor=#fefefe
| 52813 ||  || — || August 17, 1998 || Socorro || LINEAR || — || align=right | 1.8 km || 
|-id=814 bgcolor=#fefefe
| 52814 ||  || — || August 28, 1998 || Socorro || LINEAR || — || align=right | 2.2 km || 
|-id=815 bgcolor=#fefefe
| 52815 ||  || — || August 28, 1998 || Socorro || LINEAR || — || align=right | 3.3 km || 
|-id=816 bgcolor=#fefefe
| 52816 ||  || — || August 26, 1998 || La Silla || E. W. Elst || NYS || align=right | 1.3 km || 
|-id=817 bgcolor=#fefefe
| 52817 ||  || — || August 26, 1998 || La Silla || E. W. Elst || — || align=right | 2.2 km || 
|-id=818 bgcolor=#E9E9E9
| 52818 ||  || — || August 26, 1998 || La Silla || E. W. Elst || — || align=right | 2.7 km || 
|-id=819 bgcolor=#fefefe
| 52819 ||  || — || August 26, 1998 || La Silla || E. W. Elst || FLO || align=right | 2.0 km || 
|-id=820 bgcolor=#fefefe
| 52820 ||  || — || September 14, 1998 || Socorro || LINEAR || fast || align=right | 4.0 km || 
|-id=821 bgcolor=#fefefe
| 52821 ||  || — || September 14, 1998 || Socorro || LINEAR || PHO || align=right | 1.9 km || 
|-id=822 bgcolor=#fefefe
| 52822 ||  || — || September 15, 1998 || Anderson Mesa || LONEOS || — || align=right | 2.1 km || 
|-id=823 bgcolor=#fefefe
| 52823 ||  || — || September 12, 1998 || Kitt Peak || Spacewatch || — || align=right | 1.9 km || 
|-id=824 bgcolor=#fefefe
| 52824 ||  || — || September 14, 1998 || Socorro || LINEAR || — || align=right | 2.1 km || 
|-id=825 bgcolor=#fefefe
| 52825 ||  || — || September 14, 1998 || Socorro || LINEAR || — || align=right | 1.9 km || 
|-id=826 bgcolor=#fefefe
| 52826 ||  || — || September 14, 1998 || Socorro || LINEAR || — || align=right | 4.2 km || 
|-id=827 bgcolor=#fefefe
| 52827 ||  || — || September 14, 1998 || Socorro || LINEAR || NYS || align=right | 1.2 km || 
|-id=828 bgcolor=#fefefe
| 52828 ||  || — || September 14, 1998 || Socorro || LINEAR || FLO || align=right | 1.7 km || 
|-id=829 bgcolor=#fefefe
| 52829 ||  || — || September 14, 1998 || Socorro || LINEAR || — || align=right | 1.8 km || 
|-id=830 bgcolor=#fefefe
| 52830 ||  || — || September 14, 1998 || Socorro || LINEAR || ERI || align=right | 3.2 km || 
|-id=831 bgcolor=#fefefe
| 52831 ||  || — || September 14, 1998 || Socorro || LINEAR || — || align=right | 1.7 km || 
|-id=832 bgcolor=#fefefe
| 52832 ||  || — || September 14, 1998 || Socorro || LINEAR || — || align=right | 1.7 km || 
|-id=833 bgcolor=#fefefe
| 52833 ||  || — || September 14, 1998 || Socorro || LINEAR || FLO || align=right | 1.7 km || 
|-id=834 bgcolor=#fefefe
| 52834 ||  || — || September 14, 1998 || Socorro || LINEAR || FLO || align=right | 1.8 km || 
|-id=835 bgcolor=#fefefe
| 52835 ||  || — || September 14, 1998 || Socorro || LINEAR || V || align=right | 1.7 km || 
|-id=836 bgcolor=#fefefe
| 52836 ||  || — || September 14, 1998 || Socorro || LINEAR || FLO || align=right | 2.1 km || 
|-id=837 bgcolor=#fefefe
| 52837 ||  || — || September 14, 1998 || Socorro || LINEAR || FLO || align=right | 2.0 km || 
|-id=838 bgcolor=#fefefe
| 52838 ||  || — || September 14, 1998 || Socorro || LINEAR || — || align=right | 2.4 km || 
|-id=839 bgcolor=#fefefe
| 52839 ||  || — || September 14, 1998 || Socorro || LINEAR || — || align=right | 3.7 km || 
|-id=840 bgcolor=#fefefe
| 52840 ||  || — || September 14, 1998 || Socorro || LINEAR || — || align=right | 2.0 km || 
|-id=841 bgcolor=#fefefe
| 52841 ||  || — || September 14, 1998 || Socorro || LINEAR || — || align=right | 2.3 km || 
|-id=842 bgcolor=#fefefe
| 52842 ||  || — || September 14, 1998 || Socorro || LINEAR || — || align=right | 1.9 km || 
|-id=843 bgcolor=#fefefe
| 52843 ||  || — || September 14, 1998 || Socorro || LINEAR || — || align=right | 2.6 km || 
|-id=844 bgcolor=#fefefe
| 52844 ||  || — || September 14, 1998 || Socorro || LINEAR || — || align=right | 3.7 km || 
|-id=845 bgcolor=#fefefe
| 52845 ||  || — || September 14, 1998 || Socorro || LINEAR || FLO || align=right | 2.5 km || 
|-id=846 bgcolor=#fefefe
| 52846 ||  || — || September 14, 1998 || Socorro || LINEAR || — || align=right | 1.8 km || 
|-id=847 bgcolor=#fefefe
| 52847 ||  || — || September 14, 1998 || Socorro || LINEAR || — || align=right | 2.1 km || 
|-id=848 bgcolor=#fefefe
| 52848 ||  || — || September 14, 1998 || Socorro || LINEAR || — || align=right | 2.7 km || 
|-id=849 bgcolor=#fefefe
| 52849 ||  || — || September 14, 1998 || Socorro || LINEAR || — || align=right | 1.8 km || 
|-id=850 bgcolor=#fefefe
| 52850 ||  || — || September 14, 1998 || Socorro || LINEAR || NYS || align=right | 1.8 km || 
|-id=851 bgcolor=#fefefe
| 52851 ||  || — || September 14, 1998 || Socorro || LINEAR || V || align=right | 1.5 km || 
|-id=852 bgcolor=#fefefe
| 52852 ||  || — || September 14, 1998 || Socorro || LINEAR || V || align=right | 2.5 km || 
|-id=853 bgcolor=#fefefe
| 52853 ||  || — || September 14, 1998 || Socorro || LINEAR || — || align=right | 2.0 km || 
|-id=854 bgcolor=#fefefe
| 52854 ||  || — || September 14, 1998 || Socorro || LINEAR || NYS || align=right | 1.3 km || 
|-id=855 bgcolor=#fefefe
| 52855 ||  || — || September 14, 1998 || Socorro || LINEAR || — || align=right | 2.4 km || 
|-id=856 bgcolor=#fefefe
| 52856 ||  || — || September 14, 1998 || Socorro || LINEAR || — || align=right | 2.7 km || 
|-id=857 bgcolor=#fefefe
| 52857 ||  || — || September 14, 1998 || Socorro || LINEAR || V || align=right | 1.6 km || 
|-id=858 bgcolor=#fefefe
| 52858 ||  || — || September 14, 1998 || Socorro || LINEAR || FLO || align=right | 2.7 km || 
|-id=859 bgcolor=#fefefe
| 52859 ||  || — || September 14, 1998 || Socorro || LINEAR || — || align=right | 2.2 km || 
|-id=860 bgcolor=#fefefe
| 52860 || 1998 SX || — || September 16, 1998 || Caussols || ODAS || — || align=right | 1.9 km || 
|-id=861 bgcolor=#fefefe
| 52861 ||  || — || September 18, 1998 || Socorro || LINEAR || — || align=right | 1.7 km || 
|-id=862 bgcolor=#fefefe
| 52862 ||  || — || September 19, 1998 || Stroncone || V. S. Casulli || — || align=right | 2.9 km || 
|-id=863 bgcolor=#fefefe
| 52863 ||  || — || September 21, 1998 || Caussols || ODAS || — || align=right | 2.0 km || 
|-id=864 bgcolor=#fefefe
| 52864 ||  || — || September 21, 1998 || Kitt Peak || Spacewatch || V || align=right | 2.3 km || 
|-id=865 bgcolor=#fefefe
| 52865 ||  || — || September 23, 1998 || Višnjan Observatory || Višnjan Obs. || — || align=right | 2.2 km || 
|-id=866 bgcolor=#fefefe
| 52866 ||  || — || September 17, 1998 || Anderson Mesa || LONEOS || V || align=right | 1.8 km || 
|-id=867 bgcolor=#fefefe
| 52867 ||  || — || September 19, 1998 || Anderson Mesa || LONEOS || — || align=right | 3.3 km || 
|-id=868 bgcolor=#fefefe
| 52868 ||  || — || September 22, 1998 || Anderson Mesa || LONEOS || FLO || align=right | 2.5 km || 
|-id=869 bgcolor=#fefefe
| 52869 ||  || — || September 22, 1998 || Anderson Mesa || LONEOS || FLO || align=right | 3.4 km || 
|-id=870 bgcolor=#fefefe
| 52870 ||  || — || September 22, 1998 || Anderson Mesa || LONEOS || ERI || align=right | 5.5 km || 
|-id=871 bgcolor=#fefefe
| 52871 ||  || — || September 25, 1998 || Catalina || CSS || PHO || align=right | 2.3 km || 
|-id=872 bgcolor=#C7FF8F
| 52872 Okyrhoe ||  ||  || September 19, 1998 || Kitt Peak || Spacewatch || centaur || align=right | 36 km || 
|-id=873 bgcolor=#fefefe
| 52873 ||  || — || September 22, 1998 || Caussols || ODAS || V || align=right | 1.3 km || 
|-id=874 bgcolor=#fefefe
| 52874 ||  || — || September 26, 1998 || Socorro || LINEAR || FLO || align=right | 1.9 km || 
|-id=875 bgcolor=#fefefe
| 52875 ||  || — || September 20, 1998 || Xinglong || SCAP || FLO || align=right | 2.2 km || 
|-id=876 bgcolor=#fefefe
| 52876 ||  || — || September 25, 1998 || Xinglong || SCAP || — || align=right | 1.9 km || 
|-id=877 bgcolor=#fefefe
| 52877 ||  || — || September 25, 1998 || Xinglong || SCAP || NYS || align=right | 2.1 km || 
|-id=878 bgcolor=#fefefe
| 52878 ||  || — || September 25, 1998 || Kitt Peak || Spacewatch || — || align=right | 1.8 km || 
|-id=879 bgcolor=#fefefe
| 52879 ||  || — || September 25, 1998 || Kitt Peak || Spacewatch || — || align=right | 1.5 km || 
|-id=880 bgcolor=#fefefe
| 52880 ||  || — || September 30, 1998 || Kitt Peak || Spacewatch || V || align=right | 1.6 km || 
|-id=881 bgcolor=#fefefe
| 52881 ||  || — || September 16, 1998 || Anderson Mesa || LONEOS || — || align=right | 2.0 km || 
|-id=882 bgcolor=#E9E9E9
| 52882 ||  || — || September 16, 1998 || Anderson Mesa || LONEOS || — || align=right | 6.3 km || 
|-id=883 bgcolor=#fefefe
| 52883 ||  || — || September 16, 1998 || Anderson Mesa || LONEOS || — || align=right | 2.5 km || 
|-id=884 bgcolor=#fefefe
| 52884 ||  || — || September 16, 1998 || Anderson Mesa || LONEOS || FLO || align=right | 1.5 km || 
|-id=885 bgcolor=#fefefe
| 52885 ||  || — || September 16, 1998 || Anderson Mesa || LONEOS || — || align=right | 2.6 km || 
|-id=886 bgcolor=#fefefe
| 52886 ||  || — || September 16, 1998 || Anderson Mesa || LONEOS || — || align=right | 1.9 km || 
|-id=887 bgcolor=#fefefe
| 52887 ||  || — || September 17, 1998 || Anderson Mesa || LONEOS || — || align=right | 2.2 km || 
|-id=888 bgcolor=#E9E9E9
| 52888 ||  || — || September 17, 1998 || Anderson Mesa || LONEOS || — || align=right | 2.1 km || 
|-id=889 bgcolor=#fefefe
| 52889 ||  || — || September 17, 1998 || Anderson Mesa || LONEOS || V || align=right | 2.5 km || 
|-id=890 bgcolor=#fefefe
| 52890 ||  || — || September 17, 1998 || Anderson Mesa || LONEOS || FLO || align=right | 2.3 km || 
|-id=891 bgcolor=#fefefe
| 52891 ||  || — || September 17, 1998 || Anderson Mesa || LONEOS || ERI || align=right | 4.7 km || 
|-id=892 bgcolor=#fefefe
| 52892 ||  || — || September 20, 1998 || Xinglong || SCAP || — || align=right | 2.9 km || 
|-id=893 bgcolor=#fefefe
| 52893 ||  || — || September 25, 1998 || Xinglong || SCAP || — || align=right | 2.2 km || 
|-id=894 bgcolor=#fefefe
| 52894 ||  || — || September 20, 1998 || La Silla || E. W. Elst || FLO || align=right | 3.2 km || 
|-id=895 bgcolor=#fefefe
| 52895 ||  || — || September 20, 1998 || La Silla || E. W. Elst || — || align=right | 1.8 km || 
|-id=896 bgcolor=#fefefe
| 52896 ||  || — || September 20, 1998 || La Silla || E. W. Elst || NYS || align=right | 2.9 km || 
|-id=897 bgcolor=#fefefe
| 52897 ||  || — || September 20, 1998 || La Silla || E. W. Elst || — || align=right | 7.1 km || 
|-id=898 bgcolor=#fefefe
| 52898 ||  || — || September 20, 1998 || La Silla || E. W. Elst || — || align=right | 1.9 km || 
|-id=899 bgcolor=#fefefe
| 52899 ||  || — || September 20, 1998 || La Silla || E. W. Elst || — || align=right | 2.2 km || 
|-id=900 bgcolor=#fefefe
| 52900 ||  || — || September 21, 1998 || La Silla || E. W. Elst || — || align=right | 1.7 km || 
|}

52901–53000 

|-bgcolor=#fefefe
| 52901 ||  || — || September 21, 1998 || La Silla || E. W. Elst || — || align=right | 2.3 km || 
|-id=902 bgcolor=#fefefe
| 52902 ||  || — || September 21, 1998 || La Silla || E. W. Elst || — || align=right | 2.0 km || 
|-id=903 bgcolor=#fefefe
| 52903 ||  || — || September 21, 1998 || La Silla || E. W. Elst || — || align=right | 2.2 km || 
|-id=904 bgcolor=#fefefe
| 52904 ||  || — || September 21, 1998 || La Silla || E. W. Elst || — || align=right | 2.5 km || 
|-id=905 bgcolor=#fefefe
| 52905 ||  || — || September 21, 1998 || La Silla || E. W. Elst || NYS || align=right | 1.7 km || 
|-id=906 bgcolor=#fefefe
| 52906 ||  || — || September 26, 1998 || Socorro || LINEAR || NYSfast? || align=right | 1.1 km || 
|-id=907 bgcolor=#fefefe
| 52907 ||  || — || September 26, 1998 || Socorro || LINEAR || — || align=right | 2.3 km || 
|-id=908 bgcolor=#fefefe
| 52908 ||  || — || September 26, 1998 || Socorro || LINEAR || ERI || align=right | 3.3 km || 
|-id=909 bgcolor=#d6d6d6
| 52909 ||  || — || September 26, 1998 || Socorro || LINEAR || — || align=right | 4.9 km || 
|-id=910 bgcolor=#fefefe
| 52910 ||  || — || September 26, 1998 || Socorro || LINEAR || — || align=right | 1.8 km || 
|-id=911 bgcolor=#fefefe
| 52911 ||  || — || September 26, 1998 || Socorro || LINEAR || V || align=right | 1.8 km || 
|-id=912 bgcolor=#fefefe
| 52912 ||  || — || September 26, 1998 || Socorro || LINEAR || FLO || align=right | 1.6 km || 
|-id=913 bgcolor=#fefefe
| 52913 ||  || — || September 26, 1998 || Socorro || LINEAR || — || align=right | 1.7 km || 
|-id=914 bgcolor=#fefefe
| 52914 ||  || — || September 26, 1998 || Socorro || LINEAR || FLO || align=right | 2.1 km || 
|-id=915 bgcolor=#fefefe
| 52915 ||  || — || September 26, 1998 || Socorro || LINEAR || — || align=right | 1.9 km || 
|-id=916 bgcolor=#fefefe
| 52916 ||  || — || September 26, 1998 || Socorro || LINEAR || — || align=right | 2.5 km || 
|-id=917 bgcolor=#fefefe
| 52917 ||  || — || September 26, 1998 || Socorro || LINEAR || — || align=right | 2.5 km || 
|-id=918 bgcolor=#fefefe
| 52918 ||  || — || September 26, 1998 || Socorro || LINEAR || — || align=right | 2.4 km || 
|-id=919 bgcolor=#fefefe
| 52919 ||  || — || September 26, 1998 || Socorro || LINEAR || — || align=right | 4.0 km || 
|-id=920 bgcolor=#fefefe
| 52920 ||  || — || September 26, 1998 || Socorro || LINEAR || — || align=right | 2.1 km || 
|-id=921 bgcolor=#fefefe
| 52921 ||  || — || September 26, 1998 || Socorro || LINEAR || FLO || align=right | 1.7 km || 
|-id=922 bgcolor=#fefefe
| 52922 ||  || — || September 26, 1998 || Socorro || LINEAR || ERI || align=right | 3.5 km || 
|-id=923 bgcolor=#fefefe
| 52923 ||  || — || September 26, 1998 || Socorro || LINEAR || — || align=right | 2.1 km || 
|-id=924 bgcolor=#fefefe
| 52924 ||  || — || September 26, 1998 || Socorro || LINEAR || V || align=right | 1.4 km || 
|-id=925 bgcolor=#fefefe
| 52925 ||  || — || September 26, 1998 || Socorro || LINEAR || — || align=right | 2.7 km || 
|-id=926 bgcolor=#fefefe
| 52926 ||  || — || September 26, 1998 || Socorro || LINEAR || — || align=right | 1.8 km || 
|-id=927 bgcolor=#E9E9E9
| 52927 ||  || — || September 26, 1998 || Socorro || LINEAR || — || align=right | 2.8 km || 
|-id=928 bgcolor=#fefefe
| 52928 ||  || — || September 26, 1998 || Socorro || LINEAR || NYS || align=right | 1.4 km || 
|-id=929 bgcolor=#fefefe
| 52929 ||  || — || September 26, 1998 || Socorro || LINEAR || V || align=right | 1.7 km || 
|-id=930 bgcolor=#fefefe
| 52930 ||  || — || September 26, 1998 || Socorro || LINEAR || — || align=right | 3.0 km || 
|-id=931 bgcolor=#fefefe
| 52931 ||  || — || September 26, 1998 || Socorro || LINEAR || — || align=right | 2.2 km || 
|-id=932 bgcolor=#fefefe
| 52932 ||  || — || September 26, 1998 || Socorro || LINEAR || — || align=right | 3.2 km || 
|-id=933 bgcolor=#fefefe
| 52933 ||  || — || September 26, 1998 || Socorro || LINEAR || — || align=right | 2.2 km || 
|-id=934 bgcolor=#fefefe
| 52934 ||  || — || September 26, 1998 || Socorro || LINEAR || — || align=right | 2.7 km || 
|-id=935 bgcolor=#fefefe
| 52935 ||  || — || September 26, 1998 || Socorro || LINEAR || V || align=right | 1.1 km || 
|-id=936 bgcolor=#fefefe
| 52936 ||  || — || September 26, 1998 || Socorro || LINEAR || NYS || align=right | 1.7 km || 
|-id=937 bgcolor=#fefefe
| 52937 ||  || — || September 26, 1998 || Socorro || LINEAR || V || align=right | 1.8 km || 
|-id=938 bgcolor=#fefefe
| 52938 ||  || — || September 26, 1998 || Socorro || LINEAR || V || align=right | 1.7 km || 
|-id=939 bgcolor=#fefefe
| 52939 ||  || — || September 26, 1998 || Socorro || LINEAR || — || align=right | 1.4 km || 
|-id=940 bgcolor=#fefefe
| 52940 ||  || — || September 26, 1998 || Socorro || LINEAR || FLO || align=right | 1.9 km || 
|-id=941 bgcolor=#fefefe
| 52941 ||  || — || September 26, 1998 || Socorro || LINEAR || — || align=right | 2.7 km || 
|-id=942 bgcolor=#fefefe
| 52942 ||  || — || September 26, 1998 || Socorro || LINEAR || — || align=right | 2.6 km || 
|-id=943 bgcolor=#fefefe
| 52943 ||  || — || September 26, 1998 || Socorro || LINEAR || — || align=right | 1.6 km || 
|-id=944 bgcolor=#fefefe
| 52944 ||  || — || September 26, 1998 || Socorro || LINEAR || V || align=right | 1.5 km || 
|-id=945 bgcolor=#fefefe
| 52945 ||  || — || September 26, 1998 || Socorro || LINEAR || — || align=right | 1.9 km || 
|-id=946 bgcolor=#fefefe
| 52946 ||  || — || September 26, 1998 || Socorro || LINEAR || FLO || align=right | 2.3 km || 
|-id=947 bgcolor=#fefefe
| 52947 ||  || — || September 20, 1998 || La Silla || E. W. Elst || V || align=right | 1.4 km || 
|-id=948 bgcolor=#fefefe
| 52948 ||  || — || September 20, 1998 || La Silla || E. W. Elst || NYS || align=right | 1.5 km || 
|-id=949 bgcolor=#fefefe
| 52949 ||  || — || September 20, 1998 || La Silla || E. W. Elst || NYS || align=right | 1.6 km || 
|-id=950 bgcolor=#fefefe
| 52950 ||  || — || September 20, 1998 || La Silla || E. W. Elst || FLO || align=right | 2.0 km || 
|-id=951 bgcolor=#fefefe
| 52951 ||  || — || September 20, 1998 || La Silla || E. W. Elst || KLI || align=right | 3.6 km || 
|-id=952 bgcolor=#E9E9E9
| 52952 ||  || — || September 26, 1998 || Socorro || LINEAR || — || align=right | 2.7 km || 
|-id=953 bgcolor=#fefefe
| 52953 ||  || — || September 21, 1998 || Anderson Mesa || LONEOS || V || align=right | 1.3 km || 
|-id=954 bgcolor=#fefefe
| 52954 || 1998 TD || — || October 9, 1998 || Oizumi || T. Kobayashi || FLO || align=right | 2.3 km || 
|-id=955 bgcolor=#fefefe
| 52955 || 1998 TJ || — || October 10, 1998 || Oizumi || T. Kobayashi || — || align=right | 2.2 km || 
|-id=956 bgcolor=#fefefe
| 52956 || 1998 TZ || — || October 12, 1998 || Kitt Peak || Spacewatch || — || align=right | 1.3 km || 
|-id=957 bgcolor=#E9E9E9
| 52957 ||  || — || October 14, 1998 || Višnjan Observatory || K. Korlević || GEF || align=right | 4.2 km || 
|-id=958 bgcolor=#fefefe
| 52958 ||  || — || October 13, 1998 || Caussols || ODAS || NYS || align=right | 1.8 km || 
|-id=959 bgcolor=#fefefe
| 52959 ||  || — || October 13, 1998 || Caussols || ODAS || NYS || align=right | 3.7 km || 
|-id=960 bgcolor=#fefefe
| 52960 ||  || — || October 14, 1998 || Caussols || ODAS || — || align=right | 1.5 km || 
|-id=961 bgcolor=#fefefe
| 52961 ||  || — || October 12, 1998 || Kitt Peak || Spacewatch || — || align=right | 1.8 km || 
|-id=962 bgcolor=#fefefe
| 52962 ||  || — || October 13, 1998 || Kitt Peak || Spacewatch || NYS || align=right | 1.6 km || 
|-id=963 bgcolor=#fefefe
| 52963 Vercingetorix ||  ||  || October 15, 1998 || Caussols || ODAS || — || align=right | 4.5 km || 
|-id=964 bgcolor=#fefefe
| 52964 ||  || — || October 15, 1998 || Caussols || ODAS || — || align=right | 1.8 km || 
|-id=965 bgcolor=#fefefe
| 52965 ||  || — || October 15, 1998 || Caussols || ODAS || — || align=right | 1.7 km || 
|-id=966 bgcolor=#fefefe
| 52966 ||  || — || October 15, 1998 || Višnjan Observatory || K. Korlević || V || align=right | 1.3 km || 
|-id=967 bgcolor=#fefefe
| 52967 ||  || — || October 14, 1998 || Kitt Peak || Spacewatch || — || align=right | 2.4 km || 
|-id=968 bgcolor=#fefefe
| 52968 ||  || — || October 15, 1998 || Kitt Peak || Spacewatch || — || align=right | 1.5 km || 
|-id=969 bgcolor=#fefefe
| 52969 ||  || — || October 10, 1998 || Anderson Mesa || LONEOS || — || align=right | 2.0 km || 
|-id=970 bgcolor=#E9E9E9
| 52970 ||  || — || October 10, 1998 || Anderson Mesa || LONEOS || MAR || align=right | 3.6 km || 
|-id=971 bgcolor=#fefefe
| 52971 ||  || — || October 11, 1998 || Anderson Mesa || LONEOS || V || align=right | 2.2 km || 
|-id=972 bgcolor=#fefefe
| 52972 ||  || — || October 14, 1998 || Anderson Mesa || LONEOS || — || align=right | 2.3 km || 
|-id=973 bgcolor=#fefefe
| 52973 ||  || — || October 14, 1998 || Anderson Mesa || LONEOS || V || align=right | 2.5 km || 
|-id=974 bgcolor=#fefefe
| 52974 ||  || — || October 14, 1998 || Anderson Mesa || LONEOS || — || align=right | 2.3 km || 
|-id=975 bgcolor=#C7FF8F
| 52975 Cyllarus ||  ||  || October 12, 1998 || Kitt Peak || N. Danzl || centaur || align=right | 77 km || 
|-id=976 bgcolor=#fefefe
| 52976 ||  || — || October 20, 1998 || Caussols || ODAS || — || align=right | 2.6 km || 
|-id=977 bgcolor=#fefefe
| 52977 ||  || — || October 21, 1998 || Višnjan Observatory || K. Korlević || KLI || align=right | 6.6 km || 
|-id=978 bgcolor=#fefefe
| 52978 ||  || — || October 20, 1998 || Višnjan Observatory || K. Korlević || — || align=right | 2.3 km || 
|-id=979 bgcolor=#fefefe
| 52979 ||  || — || October 22, 1998 || Višnjan Observatory || K. Korlević || — || align=right | 3.0 km || 
|-id=980 bgcolor=#fefefe
| 52980 ||  || — || October 22, 1998 || Višnjan Observatory || K. Korlević || V || align=right | 1.8 km || 
|-id=981 bgcolor=#E9E9E9
| 52981 ||  || — || October 24, 1998 || Višnjan Observatory || K. Korlević || — || align=right | 2.4 km || 
|-id=982 bgcolor=#fefefe
| 52982 ||  || — || October 21, 1998 || Caussols || ODAS || — || align=right | 4.2 km || 
|-id=983 bgcolor=#fefefe
| 52983 ||  || — || October 27, 1998 || Catalina || CSS || PHO || align=right | 3.8 km || 
|-id=984 bgcolor=#fefefe
| 52984 ||  || — || October 27, 1998 || Catalina || CSS || PHO || align=right | 2.3 km || 
|-id=985 bgcolor=#fefefe
| 52985 ||  || — || October 23, 1998 || Višnjan Observatory || K. Korlević || — || align=right | 2.1 km || 
|-id=986 bgcolor=#fefefe
| 52986 ||  || — || October 29, 1998 || Višnjan Observatory || K. Korlević || — || align=right | 2.7 km || 
|-id=987 bgcolor=#fefefe
| 52987 ||  || — || October 28, 1998 || Socorro || LINEAR || FLO || align=right | 2.2 km || 
|-id=988 bgcolor=#fefefe
| 52988 ||  || — || October 28, 1998 || Socorro || LINEAR || FLO || align=right | 1.7 km || 
|-id=989 bgcolor=#fefefe
| 52989 ||  || — || October 17, 1998 || Anderson Mesa || LONEOS || FLO || align=right | 3.4 km || 
|-id=990 bgcolor=#fefefe
| 52990 ||  || — || October 18, 1998 || Anderson Mesa || LONEOS || — || align=right | 2.3 km || 
|-id=991 bgcolor=#fefefe
| 52991 ||  || — || October 18, 1998 || La Silla || E. W. Elst || V || align=right | 1.7 km || 
|-id=992 bgcolor=#fefefe
| 52992 ||  || — || October 18, 1998 || La Silla || E. W. Elst || V || align=right | 3.0 km || 
|-id=993 bgcolor=#fefefe
| 52993 ||  || — || October 18, 1998 || La Silla || E. W. Elst || — || align=right | 1.9 km || 
|-id=994 bgcolor=#fefefe
| 52994 ||  || — || October 18, 1998 || La Silla || E. W. Elst || — || align=right | 1.9 km || 
|-id=995 bgcolor=#fefefe
| 52995 ||  || — || October 27, 1998 || Xinglong || SCAP || — || align=right | 3.1 km || 
|-id=996 bgcolor=#fefefe
| 52996 ||  || — || October 29, 1998 || Xinglong || SCAP || — || align=right | 2.8 km || 
|-id=997 bgcolor=#fefefe
| 52997 ||  || — || October 28, 1998 || Socorro || LINEAR || — || align=right | 2.5 km || 
|-id=998 bgcolor=#fefefe
| 52998 ||  || — || October 28, 1998 || Socorro || LINEAR || — || align=right | 2.5 km || 
|-id=999 bgcolor=#fefefe
| 52999 ||  || — || October 28, 1998 || Socorro || LINEAR || — || align=right | 2.1 km || 
|-id=000 bgcolor=#fefefe
| 53000 ||  || — || October 28, 1998 || Socorro || LINEAR || V || align=right | 2.4 km || 
|}

References

External links 
 Discovery Circumstances: Numbered Minor Planets (50001)–(55000) (IAU Minor Planet Center)

0052